= 1985 North Indian Ocean cyclone season =

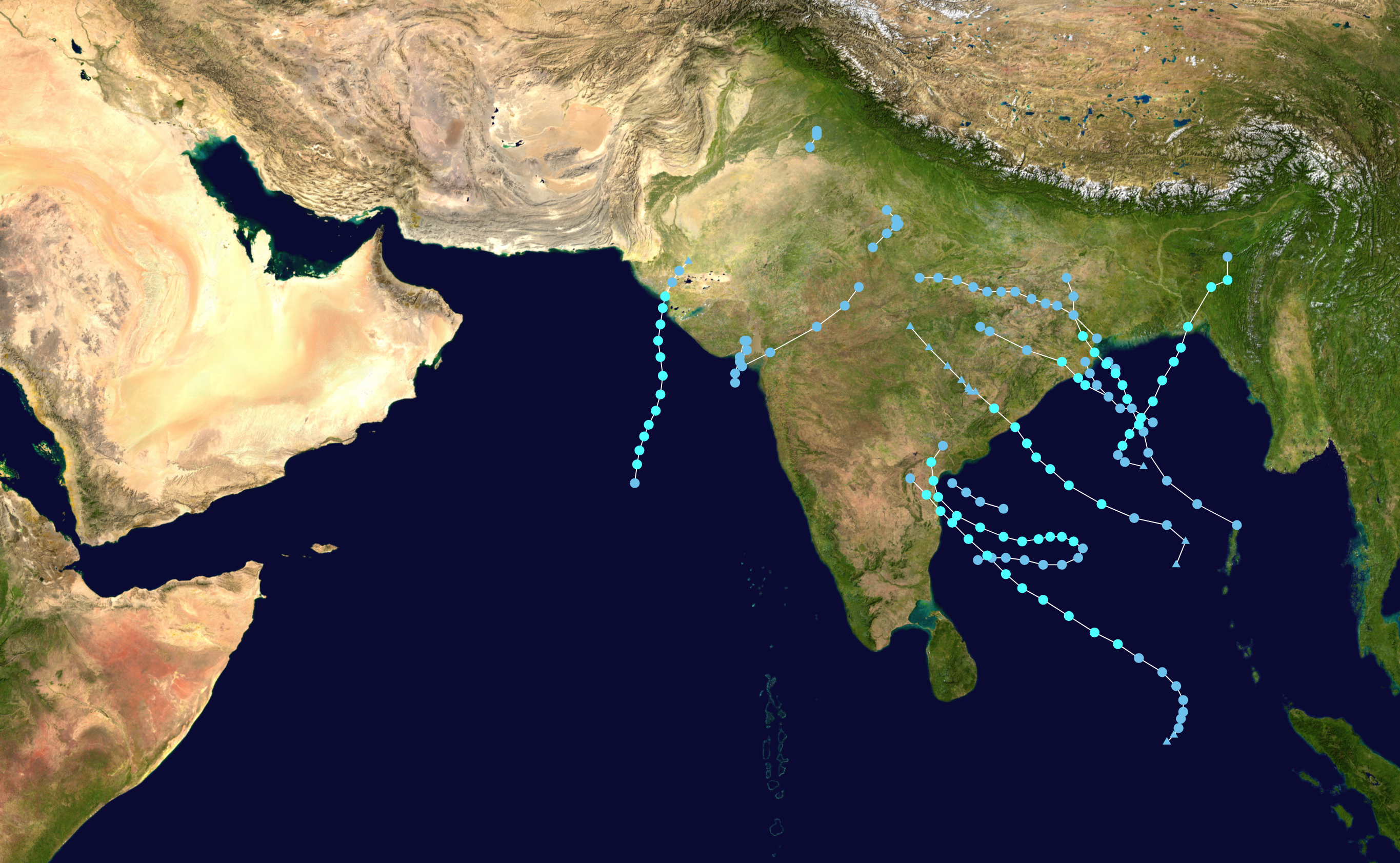
- Season summary map

Seasonal boundaries
- First system formed: May 21, 1985
- Last system dissipated: December 14, 1985

Strongest storm
- Name: BOB 01
  - Maximum winds: 120 km/h (75 mph) (3-minute sustained)
  - Lowest pressure: 979 hPa (mbar)

Seasonal statistics
- Depressions: 14
- Deep depressions: 7
- Cyclonic storms: 7
- Severe cyclonic storms: 1
- Very severe cyclonic storms: 1
- Total fatalities: 11,107
- Total damage: Unknown

Related articles
- 1985 Atlantic hurricane season; 1985 Pacific hurricane season; 1985 Pacific typhoon season

The 1985 North Indian Ocean cyclone season was an active season featuring 7 cyclonic storms, though most of the storms remained weak. The season has no official bounds but cyclones tend to form between April and December. These dates conventionally delimit the period of each year when most tropical cyclones form in the northern Indian Ocean. There are two main seas in the North Indian Ocean—the Bay of Bengal to the east of the Indian subcontinent and the Arabian Sea to the west of India. The official Regional Specialized Meteorological Centre in this basin is the India Meteorological Department (IMD), while the Joint Typhoon Warning Center (JTWC) releases unofficial advisories. An average of five tropical cyclones form in the North Indian Ocean every season with peaks in May and November. Cyclones occurring between the meridians 45°E and 100°E are included in the season by the IMD.

== Systems ==
=== Very Severe Cyclonic Storm BOB 01 ===
- Very severe cyclonic storm (IMD)
- Tropical storm (SSHWS)
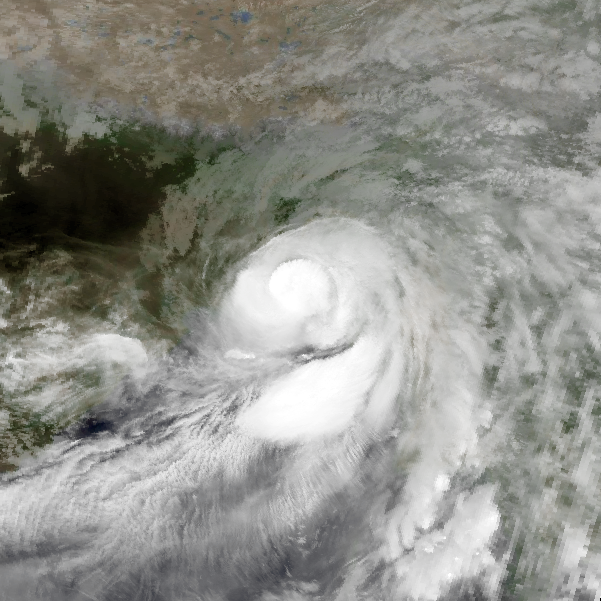
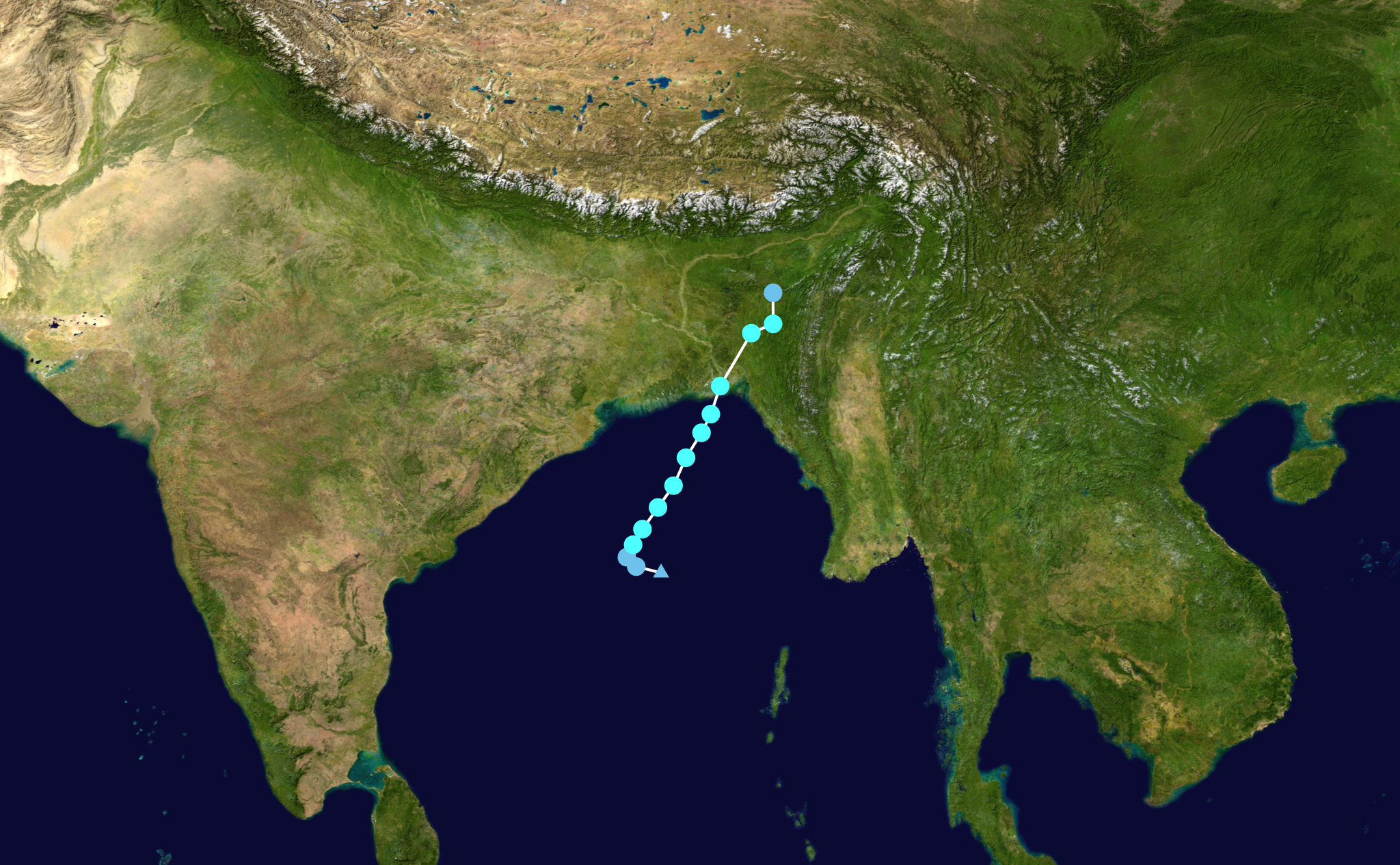
- Duration: May 22 – May 25
- Peak intensity: 120 km/h (75 mph) (3-min); 979 hPa (mbar)

Tropical Storm One, which developed in the central Bay of Bengal on May 22, strengthened to a peak of 70 mph winds before hitting Bangladesh on the 25th. The storm brought torrential rains and flooding, killing around 11,069 people and leaving hundreds of thousands homeless. Advance warning likely cut back on what could have been a much higher death toll.

=== Cyclonic Storm ARB 01 ===
- Cyclonic storm (IMD)
- Tropical storm (SSHWS)
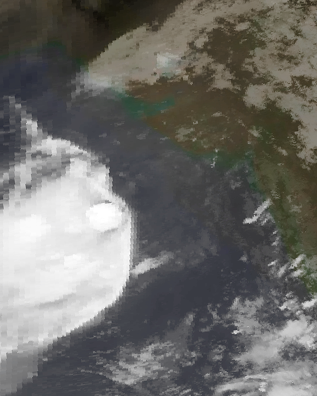
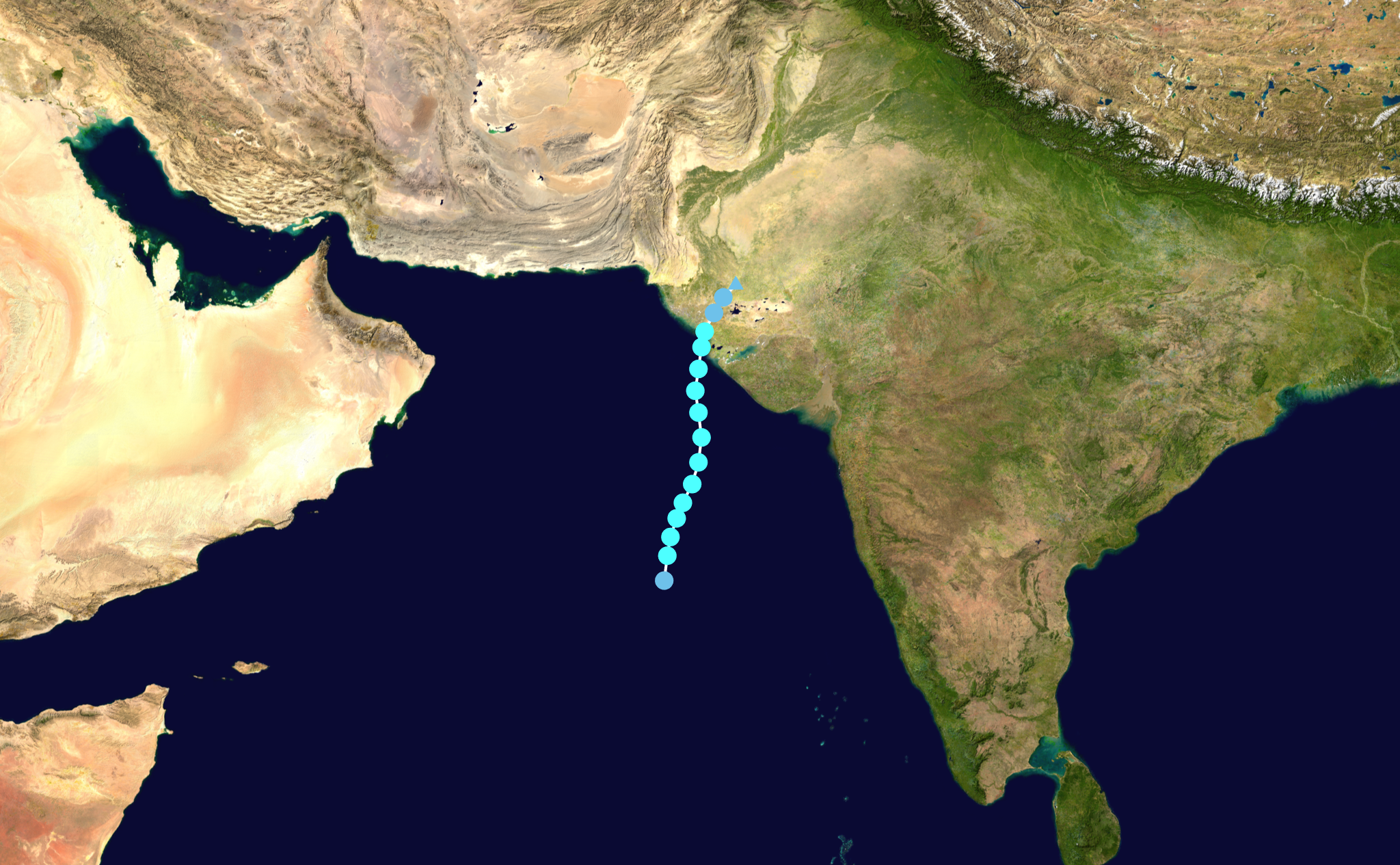
- Duration: May 28 – June 1
- Peak intensity: 85 km/h (50 mph) (3-min); 987 hPa (mbar)

A tropical depression formed in the central Arabian Sea on May 28. It headed northward, reaching a peak of 60 mph winds before hitting western India on the 31st. The storm dissipated on the 1st.

=== Depression BOB 02 ===
- Depression (IMD)
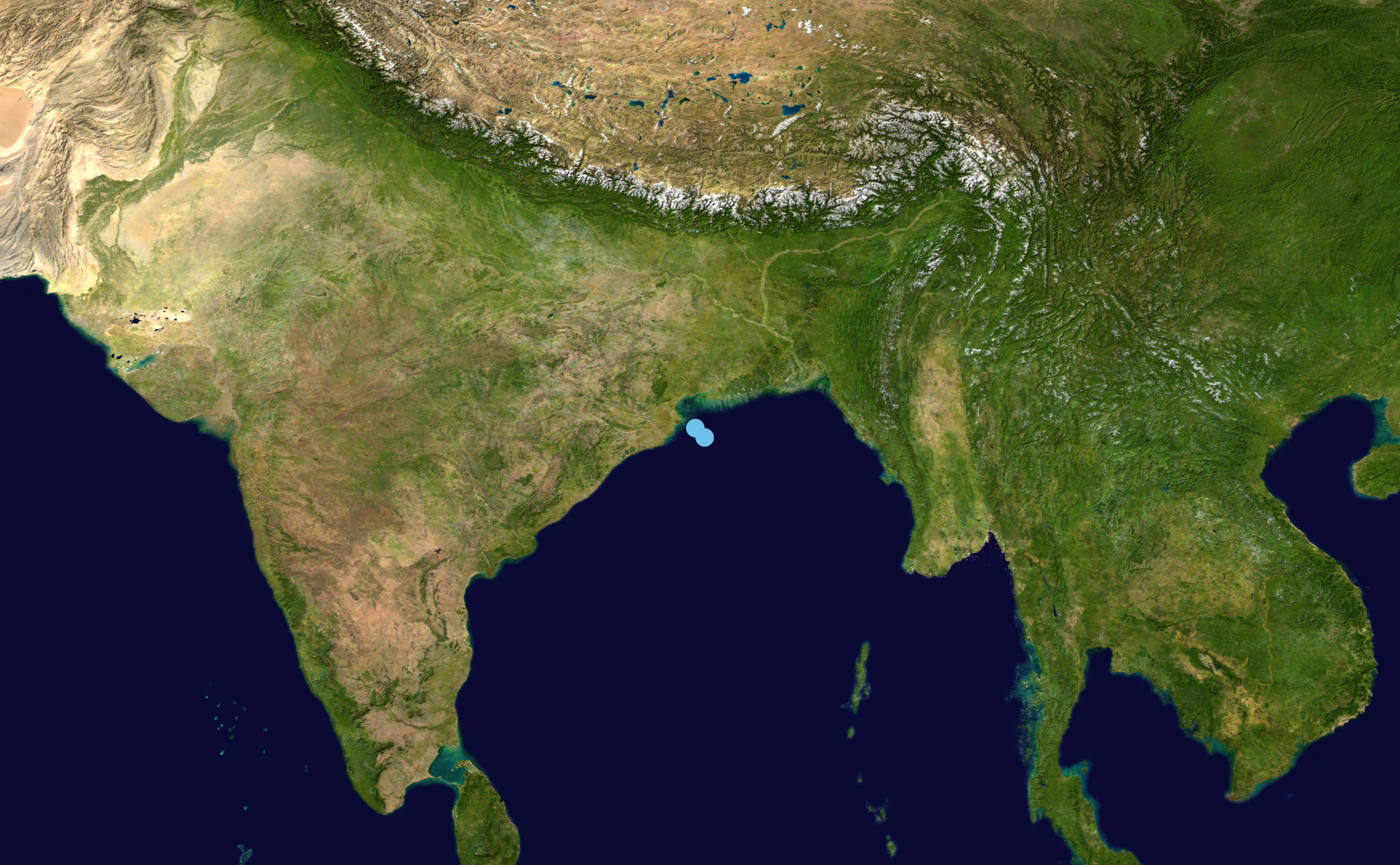
- Duration: August 1 – August 2
- Peak intensity: 45 km/h (30 mph) (3-min);

=== Depression LAND 01 ===
- Depression (IMD)
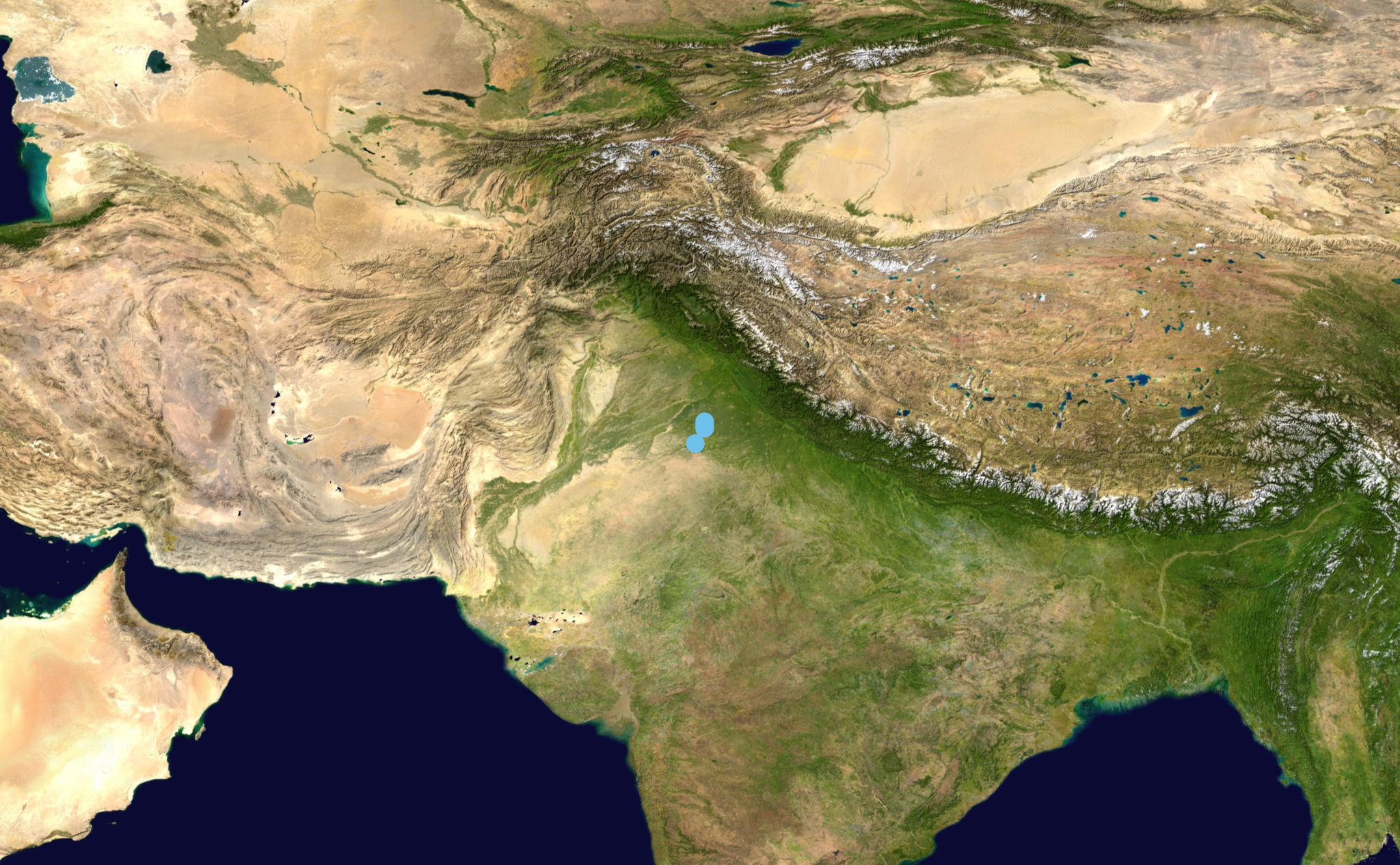
- Duration: August 5 – August 6
- Peak intensity: 45 km/h (30 mph) (3-min);

=== Depression BOB 03 ===
- Depression (IMD)
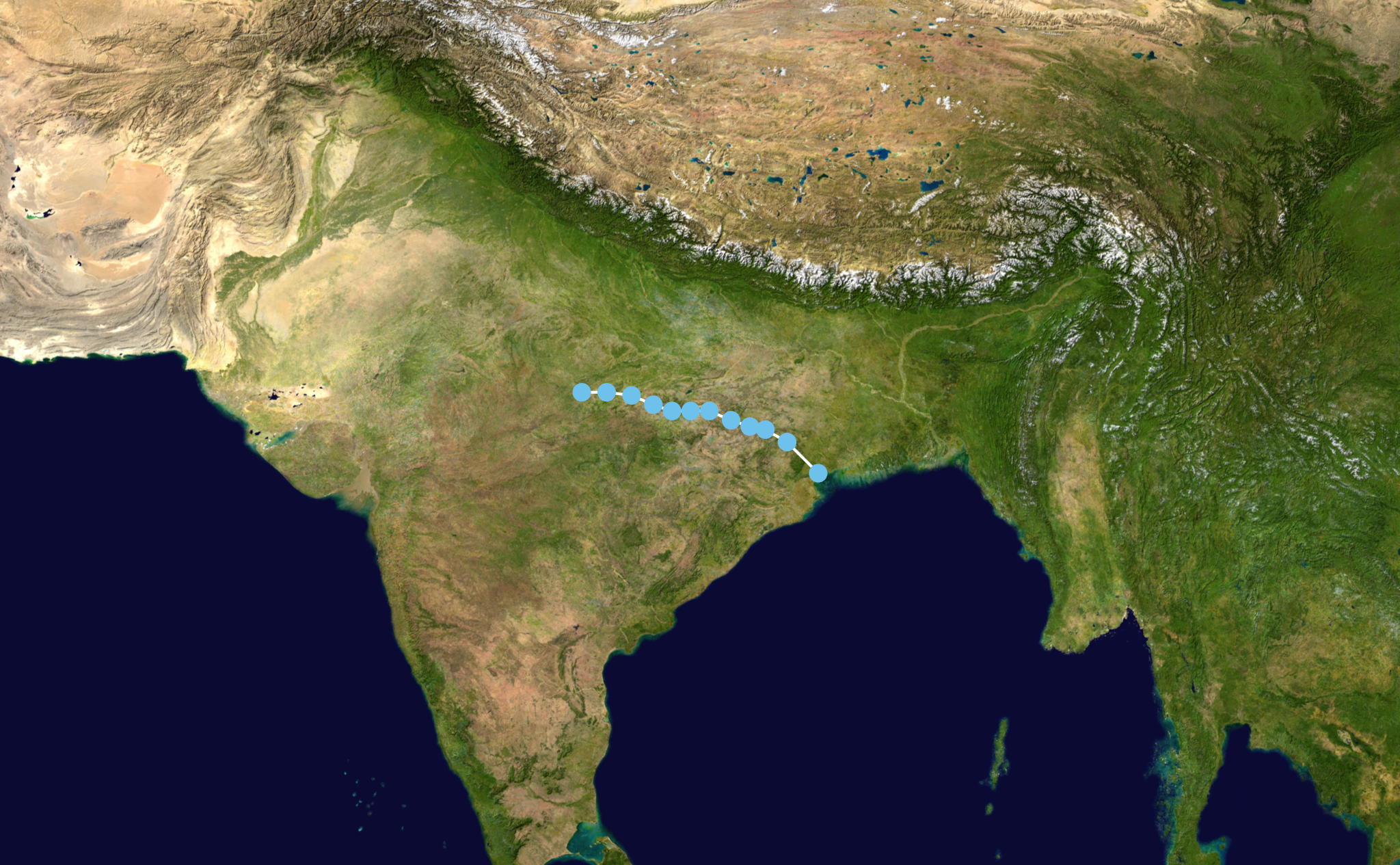
- Duration: August 6 – August 9
- Peak intensity: 45 km/h (30 mph) (3-min);

=== Depression BOB 04 ===
- Depression (IMD)
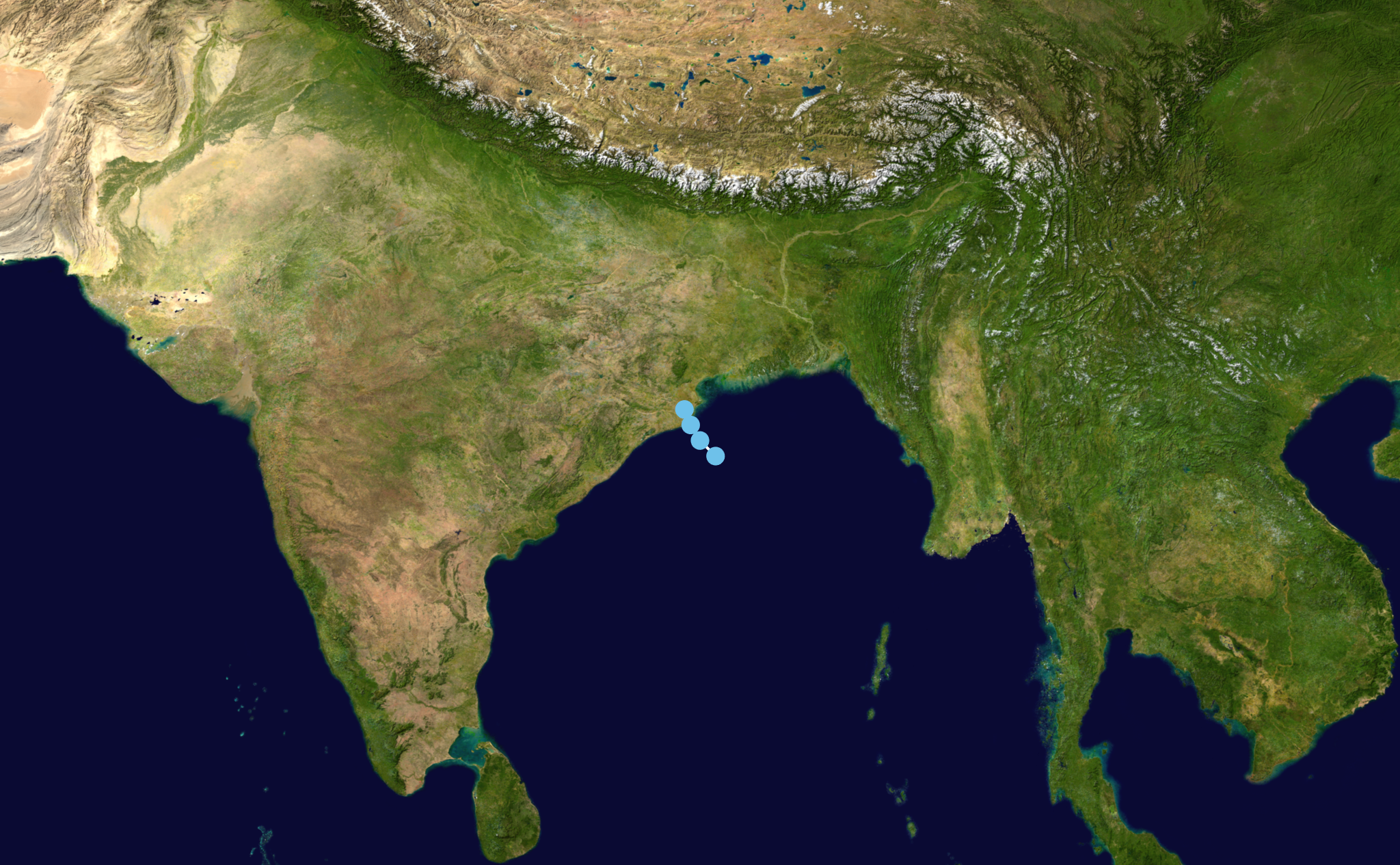
- Duration: August 14 – August 15
- Peak intensity: 45 km/h (30 mph) (3-min);

=== Cyclonic Storm BOB 05 ===
- Cyclonic storm (IMD)
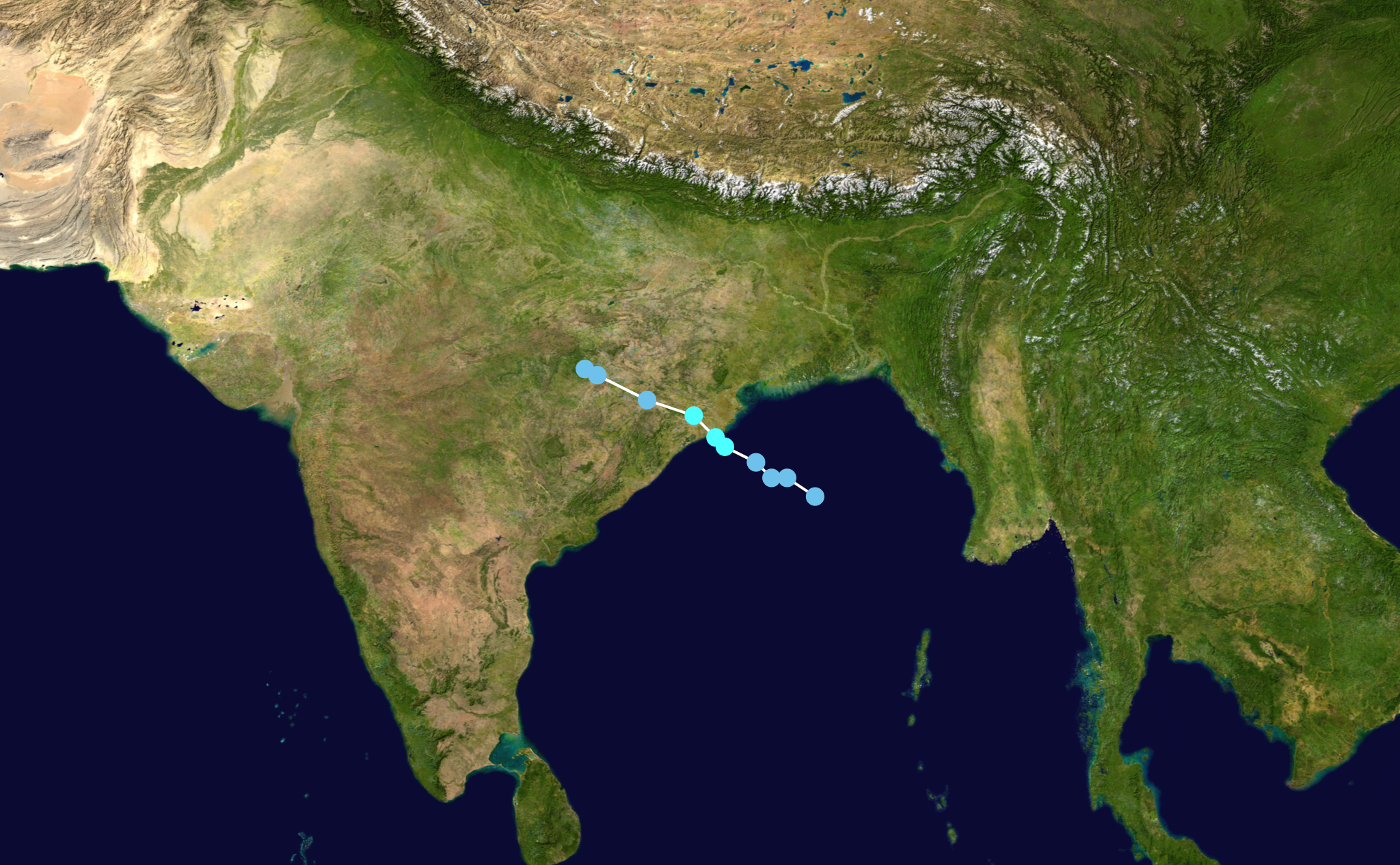
- Duration: September 19 – September 22
- Peak intensity: 85 km/h (50 mph) (3-min);

=== Depression LAND 02 ===
- Depression (IMD)
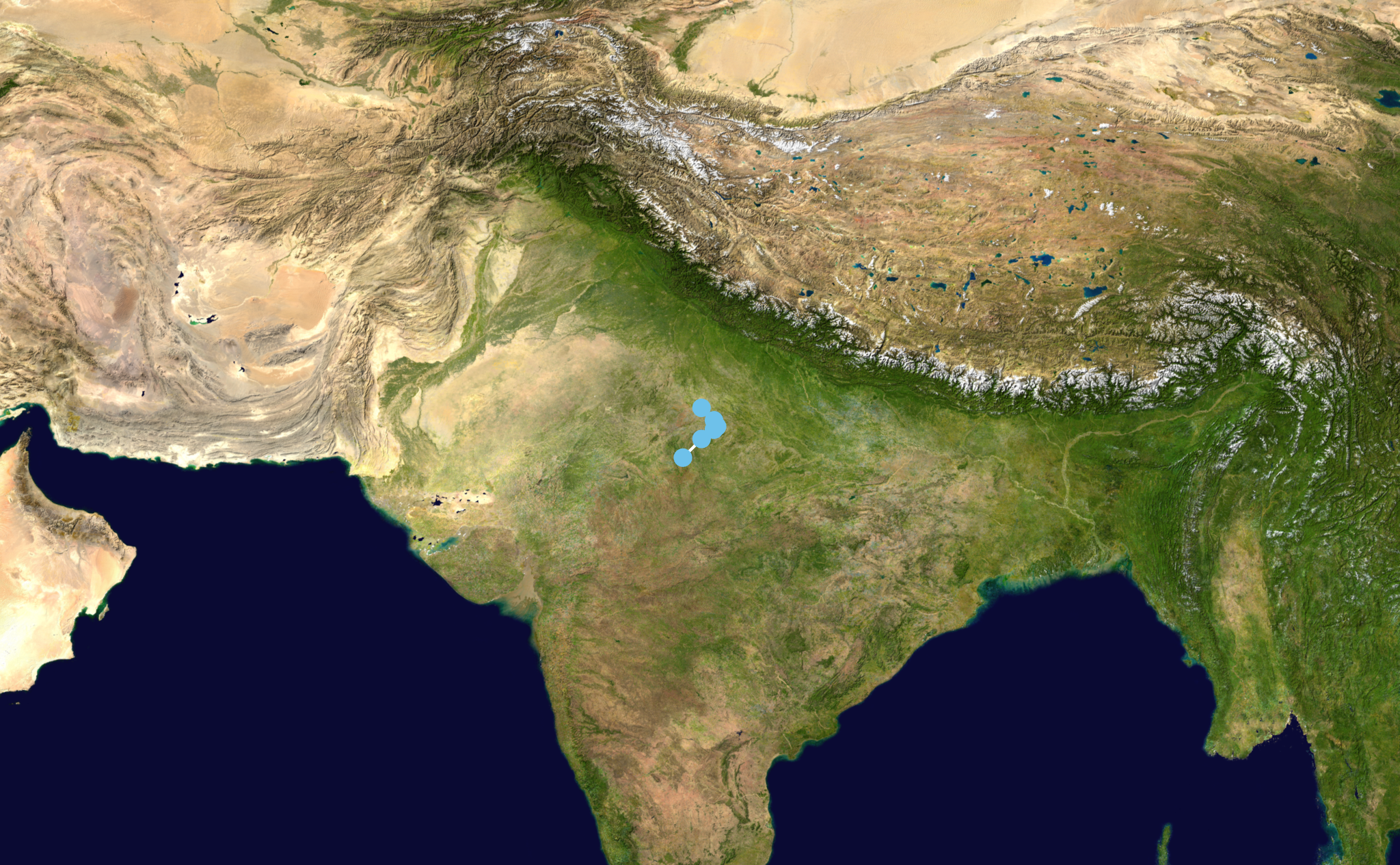
- Duration: September 23 – September 24
- Peak intensity: 45 km/h (30 mph) (3-min);

=== Depression BOB 06 ===
- Depression (IMD)
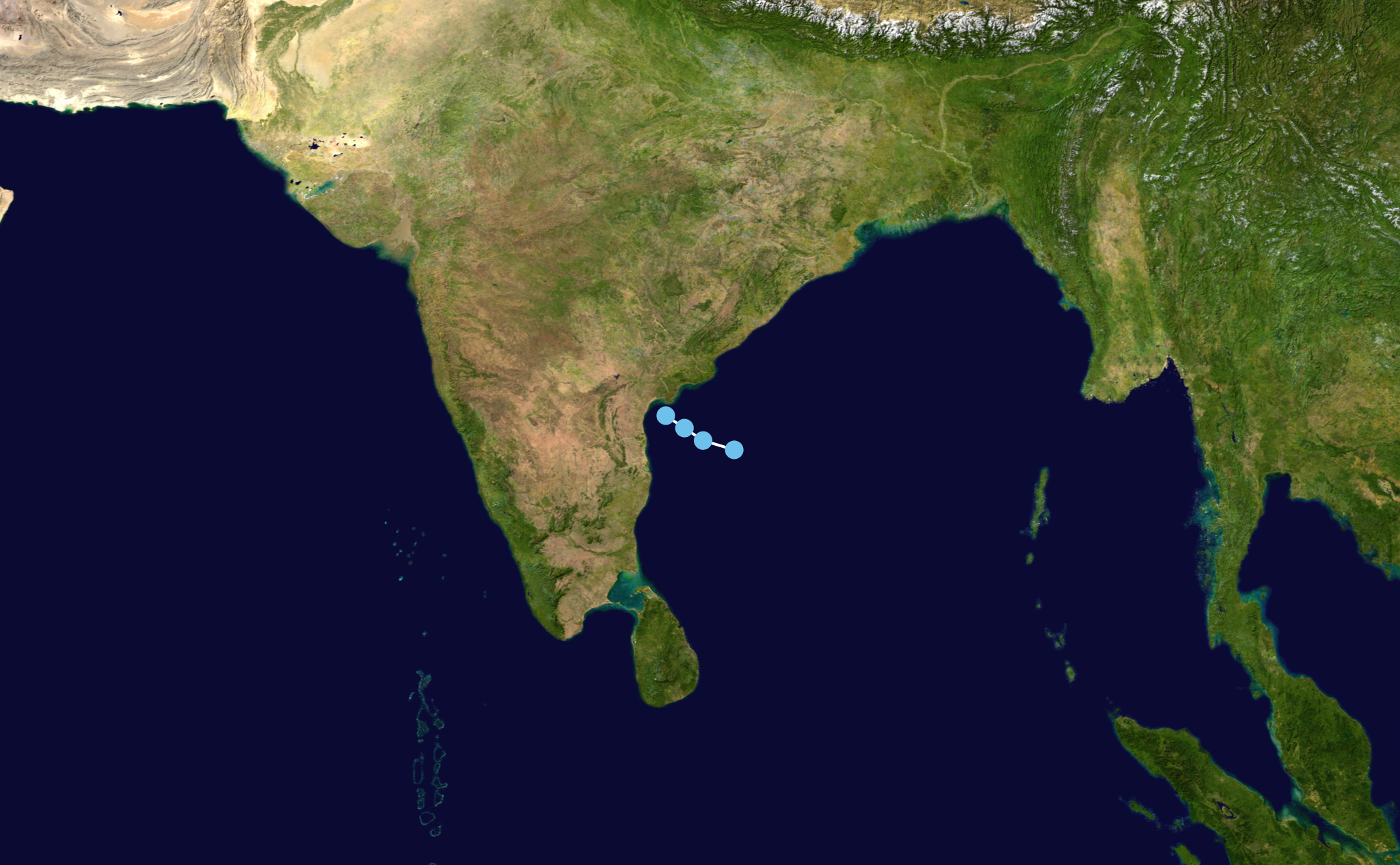
- Duration: October 1 – October 2
- Peak intensity: 45 km/h (30 mph) (3-min);

=== Depression ARB 02 ===
- Depression (IMD)
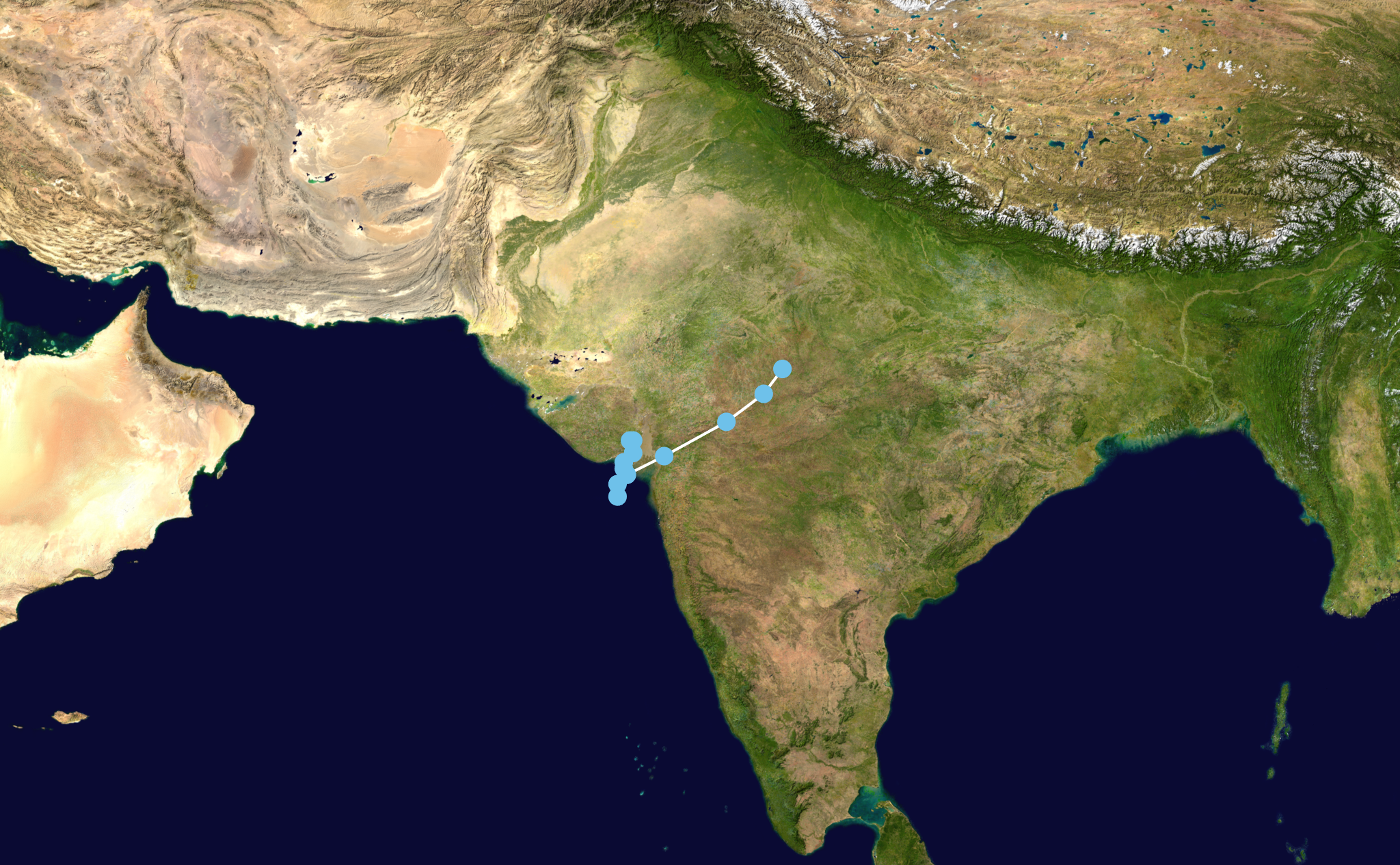
- Duration: October 6 – October 9
- Peak intensity: 45 km/h (30 mph) (3-min);

=== Cyclonic Storm BOB 07 ===
- Cyclonic storm (IMD)
- Tropical storm (SSHWS)
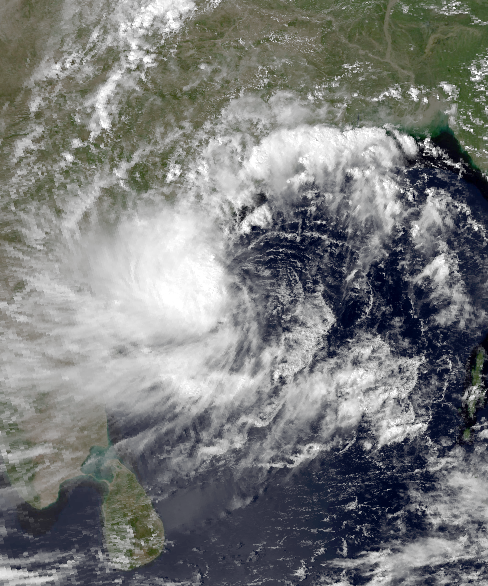
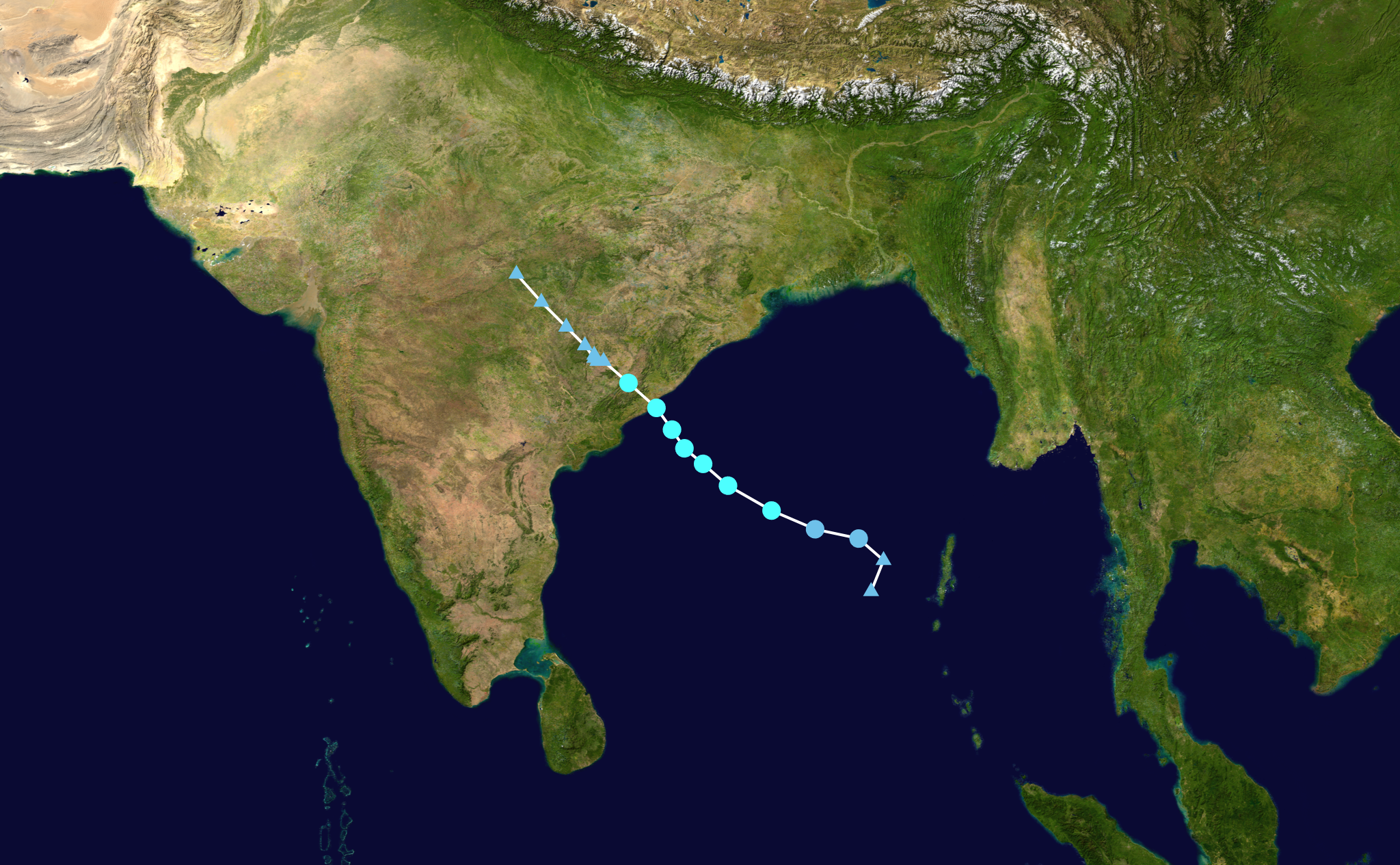
- Duration: October 8 – October 11
- Peak intensity: 85 km/h (50 mph) (3-min); 988 hPa (mbar)

Tropical Storm Three, which developed in the central Bay of Bengal, moved northwestward to hit India on the 11th as a 60 mph storm.

=== Cyclonic Storm BOB 08 ===
- Cyclonic storm (IMD)
- Tropical storm (SSHWS)
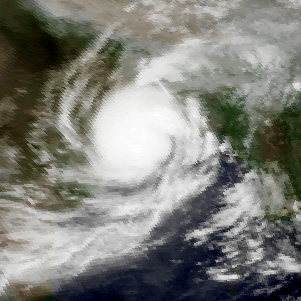
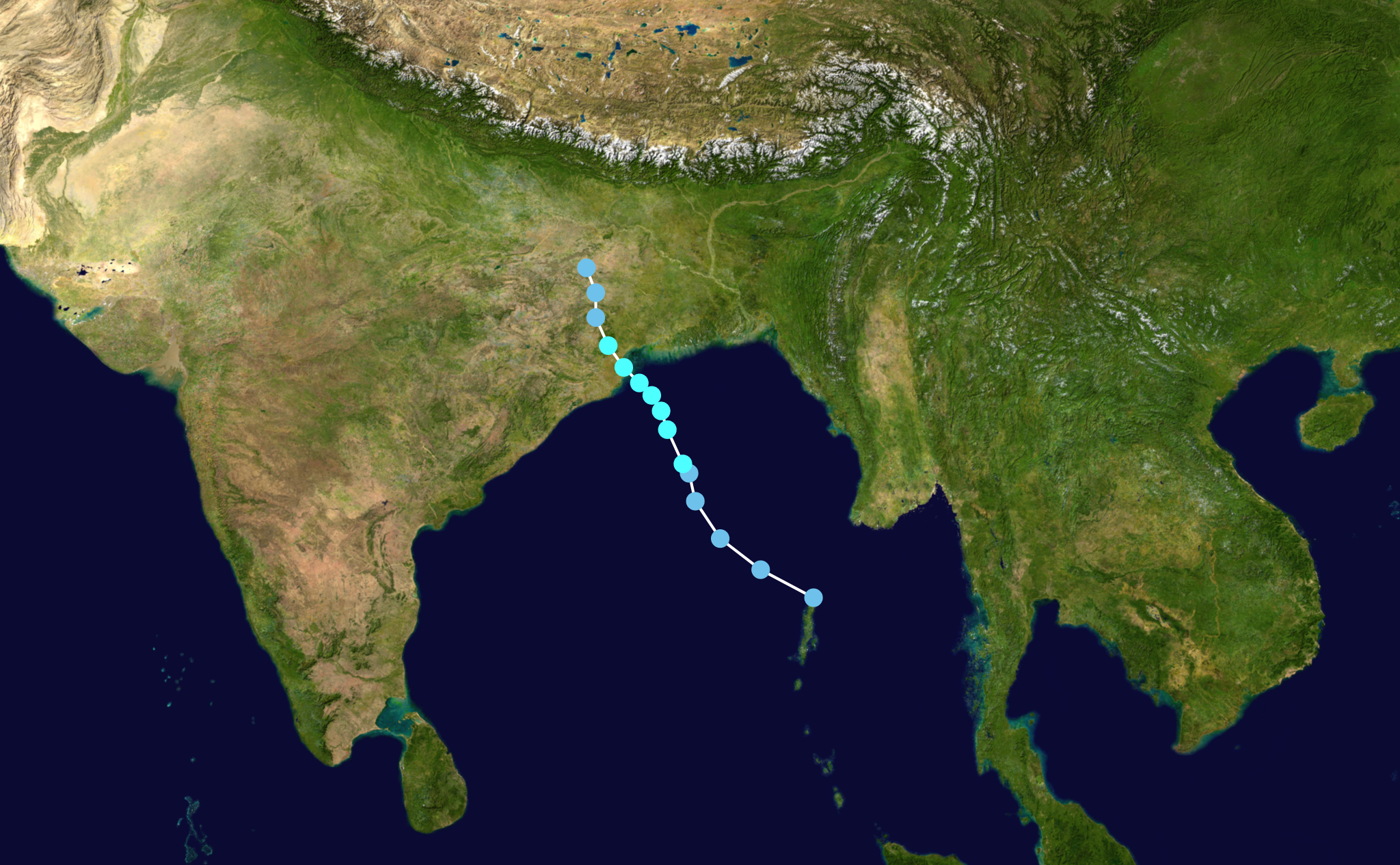
- Duration: October 9 – October 17
- Peak intensity: 85 km/h (50 mph) (3-min); 987 hPa (mbar)

Tropical Cyclone 04B had a long life. It was first detected on 9 October, almost a week before the initial warning was issued, as an area of poorly organized convection in the South China Sea. The Tropical Disturbance was developing in the active monsoon trough, midway between Tropical Cyclone 03B in the Bay of Bengal, and a disturbance in the Philippine Sea that would soon develop into Typhoon Cecil. 38 people were killed when the 60 mph Tropical Storm Four hit the state of Odisha in India on October 16. Storm surge as high as 2 meters hit the villages of Chilika, Tangi and Krishna Prasad in at the time of landfall which resulted to be submerged for three days.

=== Cyclonic Storm BOB 09 ===
- Cyclonic storm (IMD)
- Tropical storm (SSHWS)
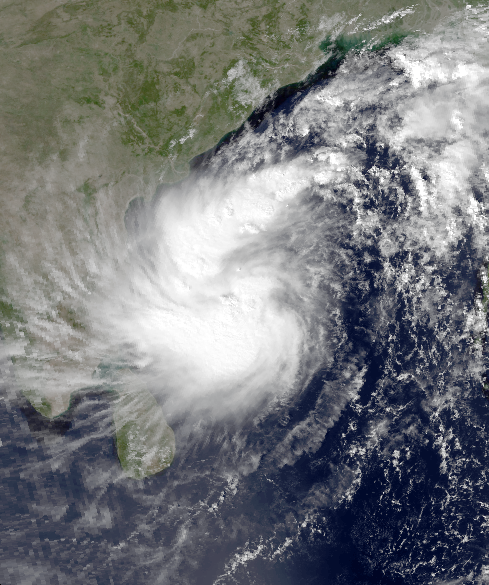
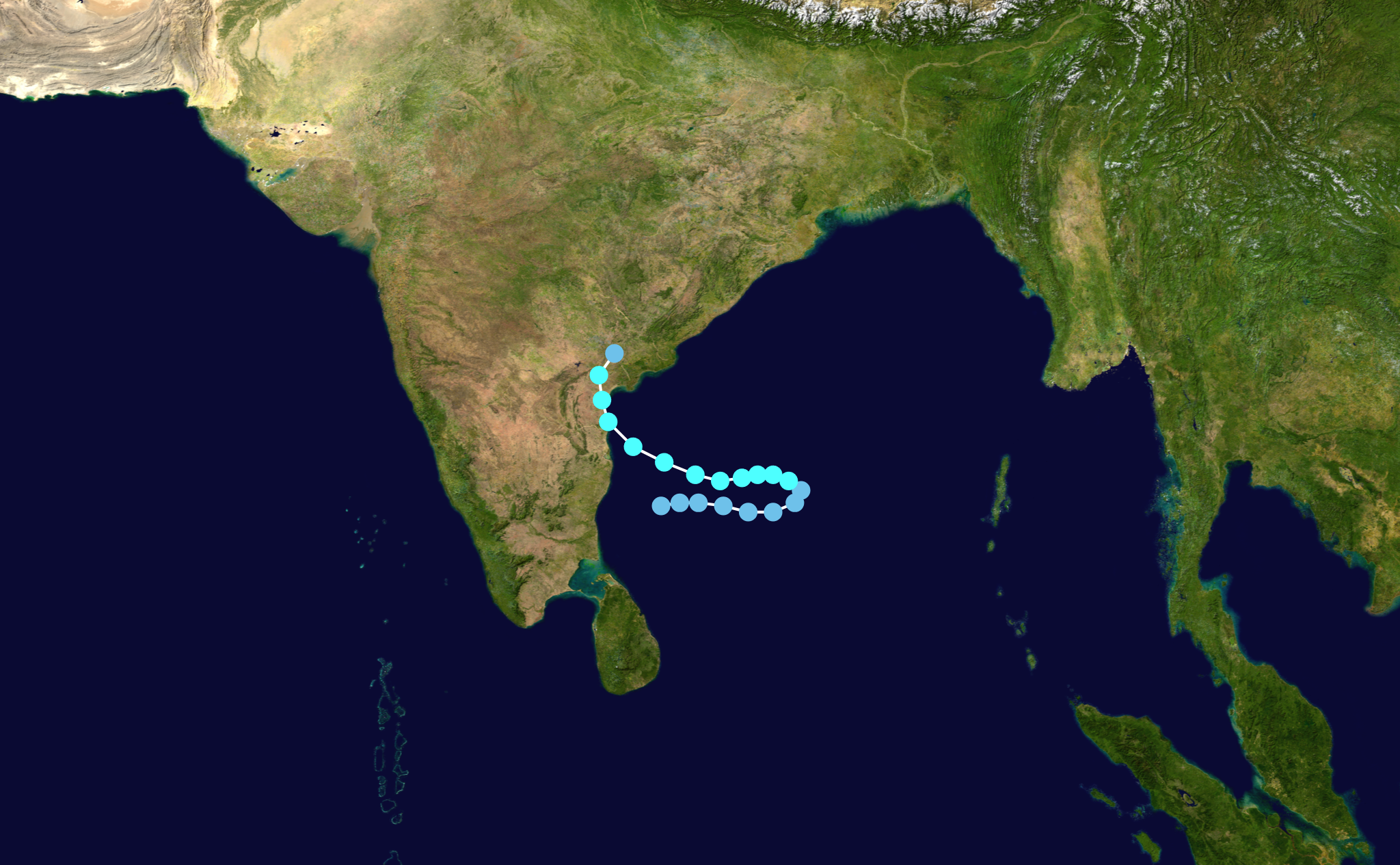
- Duration: November 13 – November 18
- Peak intensity: 85 km/h (50 mph) (3-min); 983 hPa (mbar)

On November 17, 65 mph Tropical Storm Five, which developed on the 13th, hit eastern India. The storm brought heavy flooding, but no damage or deaths were reported.

=== Cyclonic Storm BOB 10 ===
- Cyclonic storm (IMD)
- Tropical storm (SSHWS)
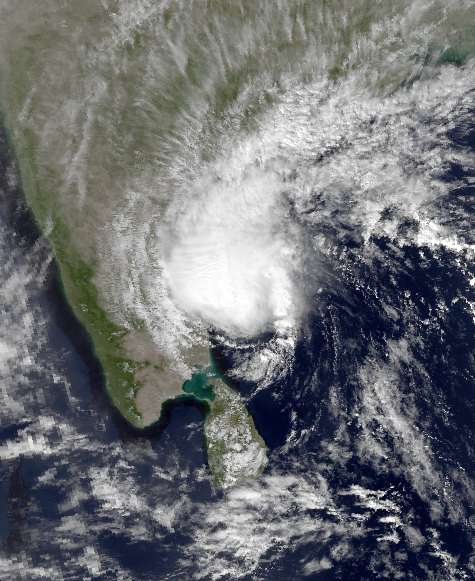
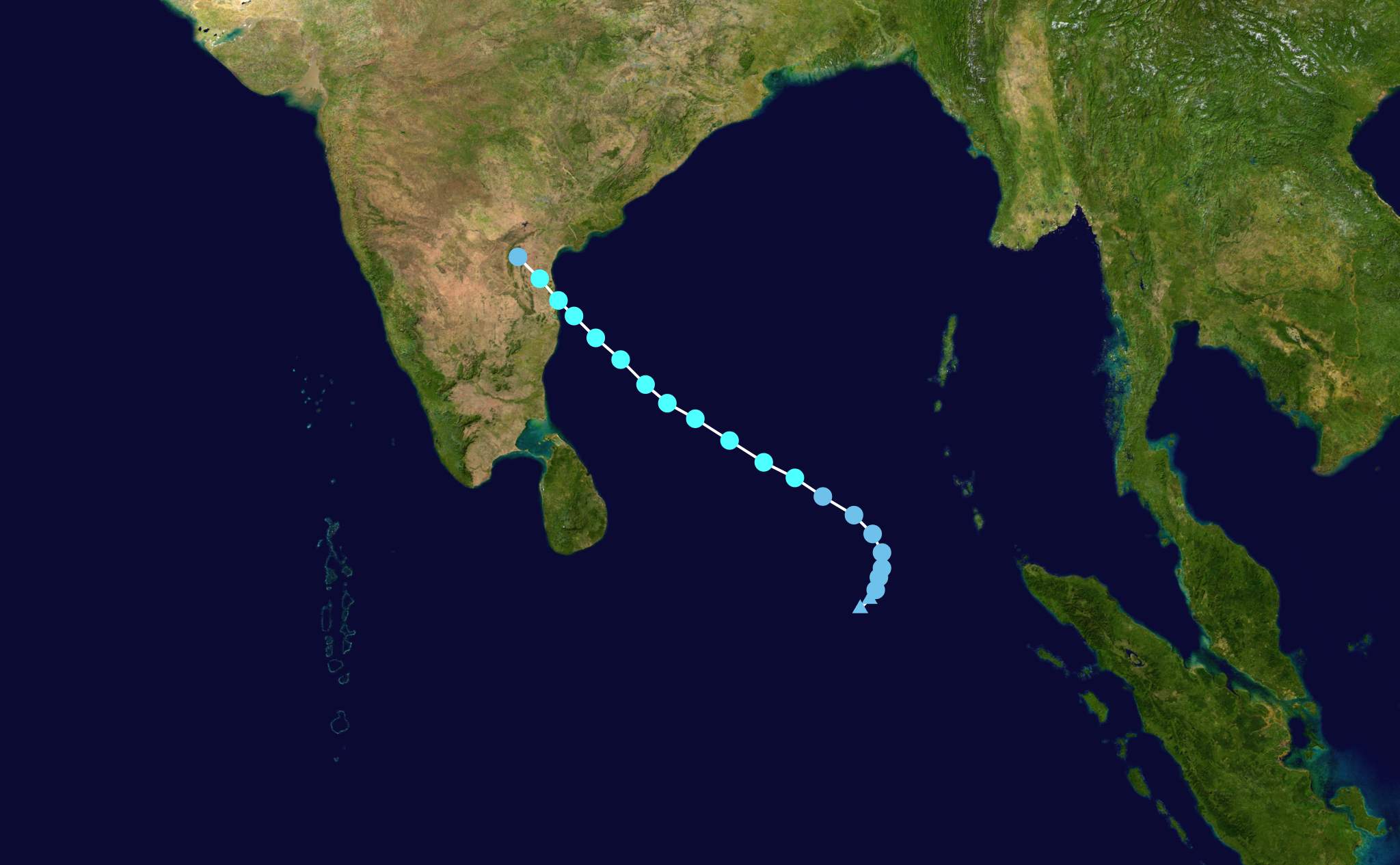
- Duration: December 9 – December 14
- Peak intensity: 65 km/h (40 mph) (3-min); 987 hPa (mbar)

50 mph Tropical Storm Six, having developed on December 9, hit southeastern India on the 13th.

== See also ==
- North Indian Ocean tropical cyclone
- Weather of 1985
- 1985 Atlantic hurricane season
- 1985 Pacific hurricane season
- 1985 Pacific typhoon season
- Australian cyclone seasons: 1984–85, 1985–86
- South Pacific cyclone seasons: 1984–85, 1985–86
- South-West Indian Ocean cyclone seasons: 1984–85, 1985–86
