= 1984–85 South Pacific cyclone season =

Tropical cyclone season

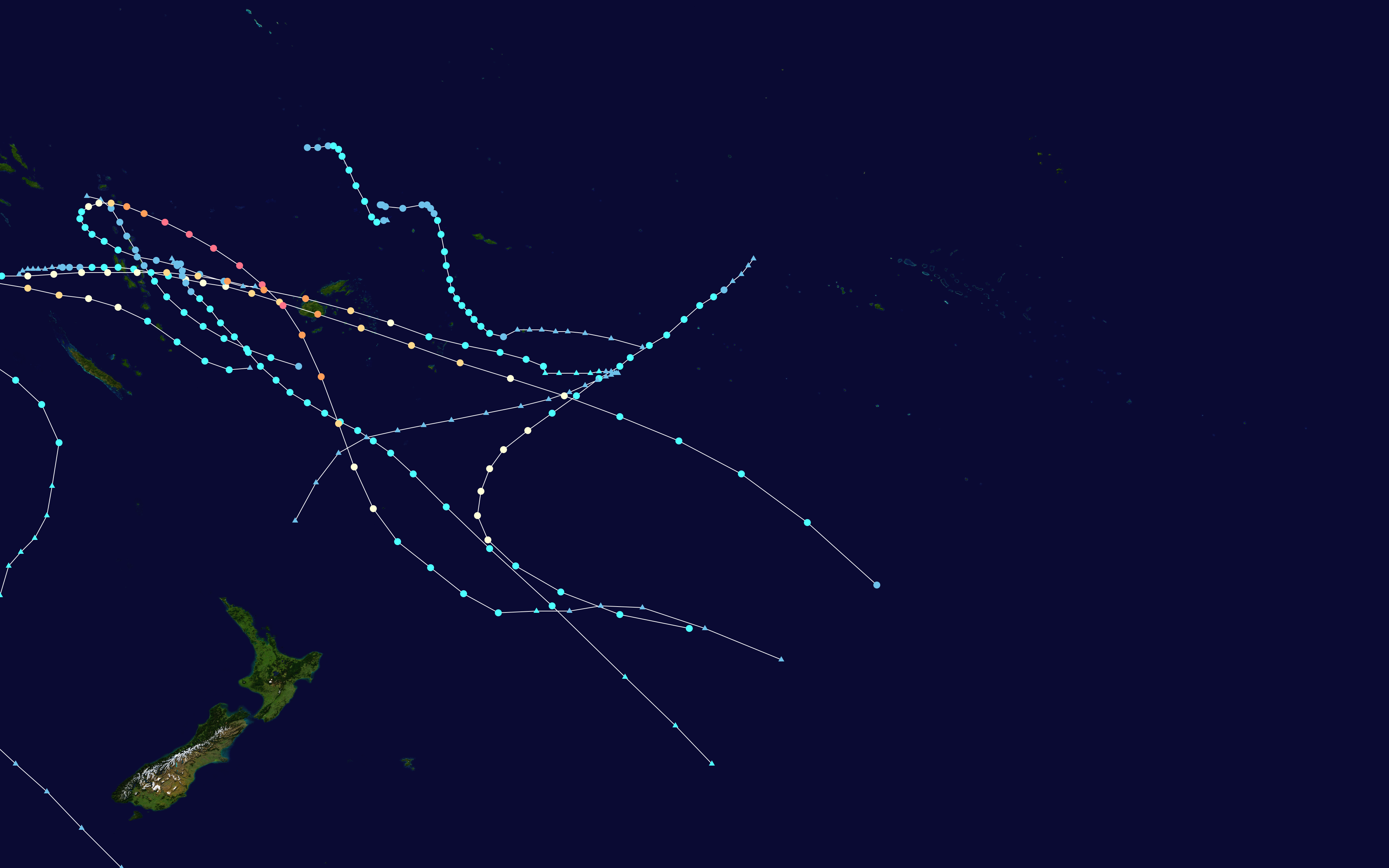
- Season summary map

Seasonal boundaries
- First system formed: December 26, 1984
- Last system dissipated: March 20, 1985

Strongest storm
- Name: Hina
  - Maximum winds: 220 km/h (140 mph) (10-minute sustained)
  - Lowest pressure: 910 hPa (mbar)

Seasonal statistics
- Total depressions: 9, 1 unofficial
- Tropical cyclones: 9, 1 unofficial
- Severe tropical cyclones: 5
- Total fatalities: 37
- Total damage: > $40 million (1985 USD)

Related articles
- 1984–85 South-West Indian Ocean cyclone season; 1984–85 Australian region cyclone season

The 1984–85 South Pacific cyclone season was an above-average tropical cyclone season, with nine tropical cyclones occurring within the basin between 160°E and 120°W. The season ran from November 1, 1984, to April 30, 1985, with tropical cyclones officially monitored by the Fiji Meteorological Service (FMS), Australian Bureau of Meteorology (BoM) and New Zealand's MetService. The United States Joint Typhoon Warning Center (JTWC) and other national meteorological services including Météo-France and NOAA also monitored the basin during the season. During the season there was nine tropical cyclones occurring within the basin, including three that moved into the basin from the Australian region. The BoM, MetService and RSMC Nadi all estimated sustained wind speeds over a period of 10-minutes, which are subsequently compared to the Australian tropical cyclone intensity scale, while the JTWC estimated sustained winds over a 1-minute period, which are subsequently compared to the Saffir–Simpson hurricane wind scale (SSHWS).

== Seasonal summary ==
During November and December no significant tropical cyclones developed in or moved into the basin in the region,

The remnants of Tropical Cyclone Pierre were last noted during 24 February, as they moved into the basin from the Australian region.

== Systems ==
=== Unnamed tropical cyclone ===
- Category 1 tropical cyclone (Australian scale)
- Tropical storm (SSHWS)
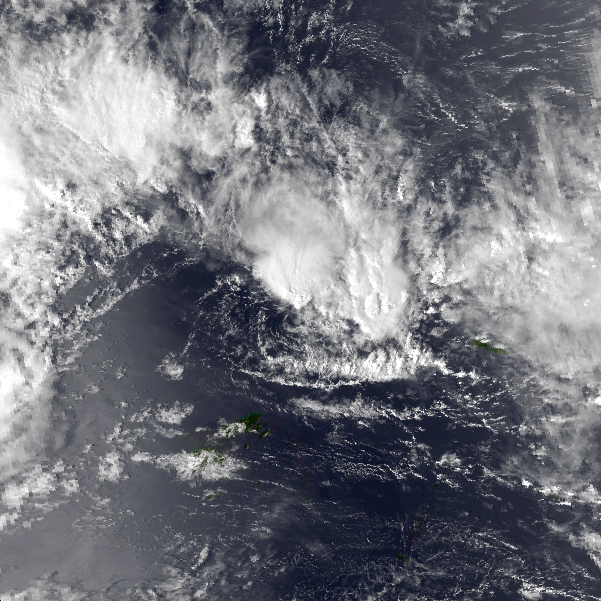
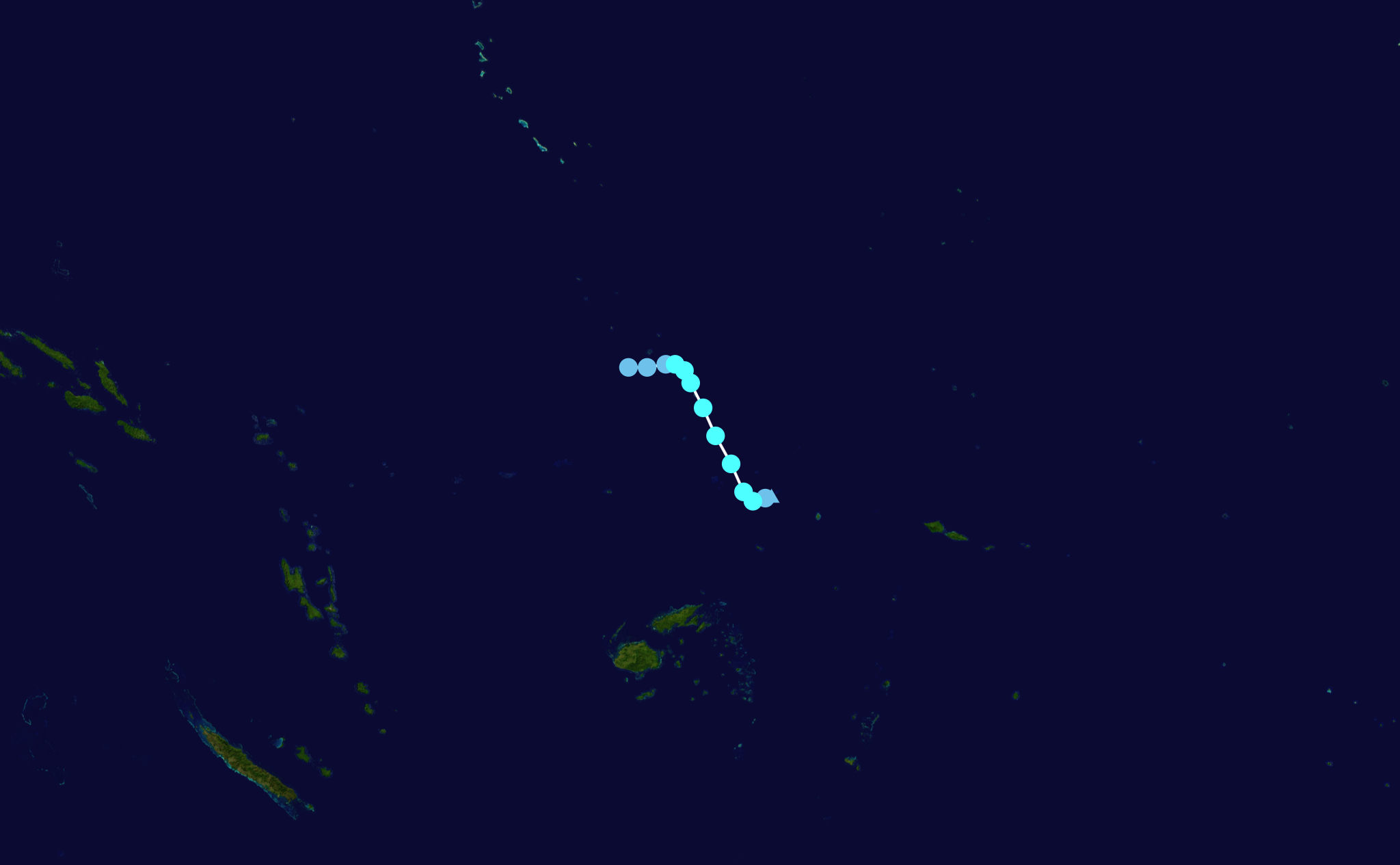
- Duration: December 26 – December 28
- Peak intensity: 85 km/h (50 mph) (10-min); 987 hPa (mbar)

An unnamed tropical system developed on December 26 and subsequently dissipated on December 28.

=== Tropical Cyclone Monica ===
- Category 2 tropical cyclone (Australian scale)
- Tropical storm (SSHWS)
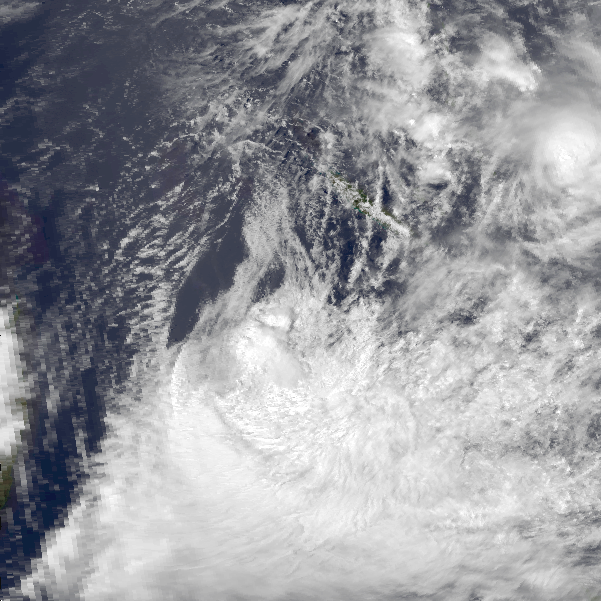
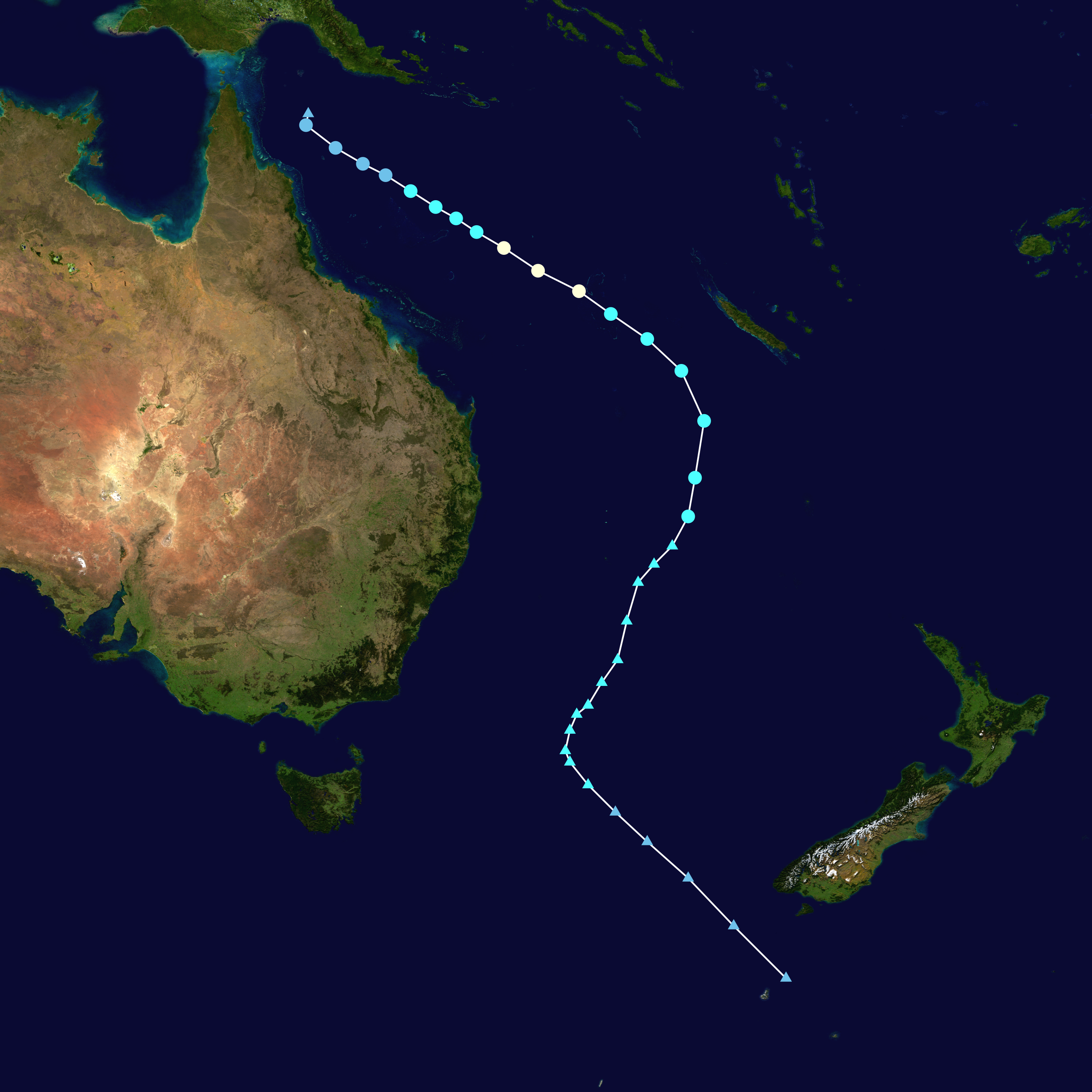
- Duration: December 28 (Entered basin) – December 29
- Peak intensity: 110 km/h (70 mph) (10-min); 975 hPa (mbar)

Tropical Cyclone Monica existed from December 29 to December 30.

=== Tropical Cyclone Drena ===
- Category 1 tropical cyclone (Australian scale)
- Tropical storm (SSHWS)
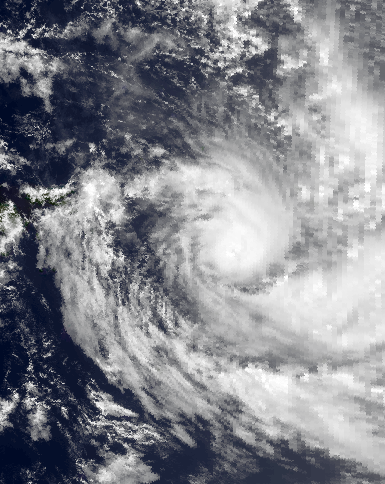
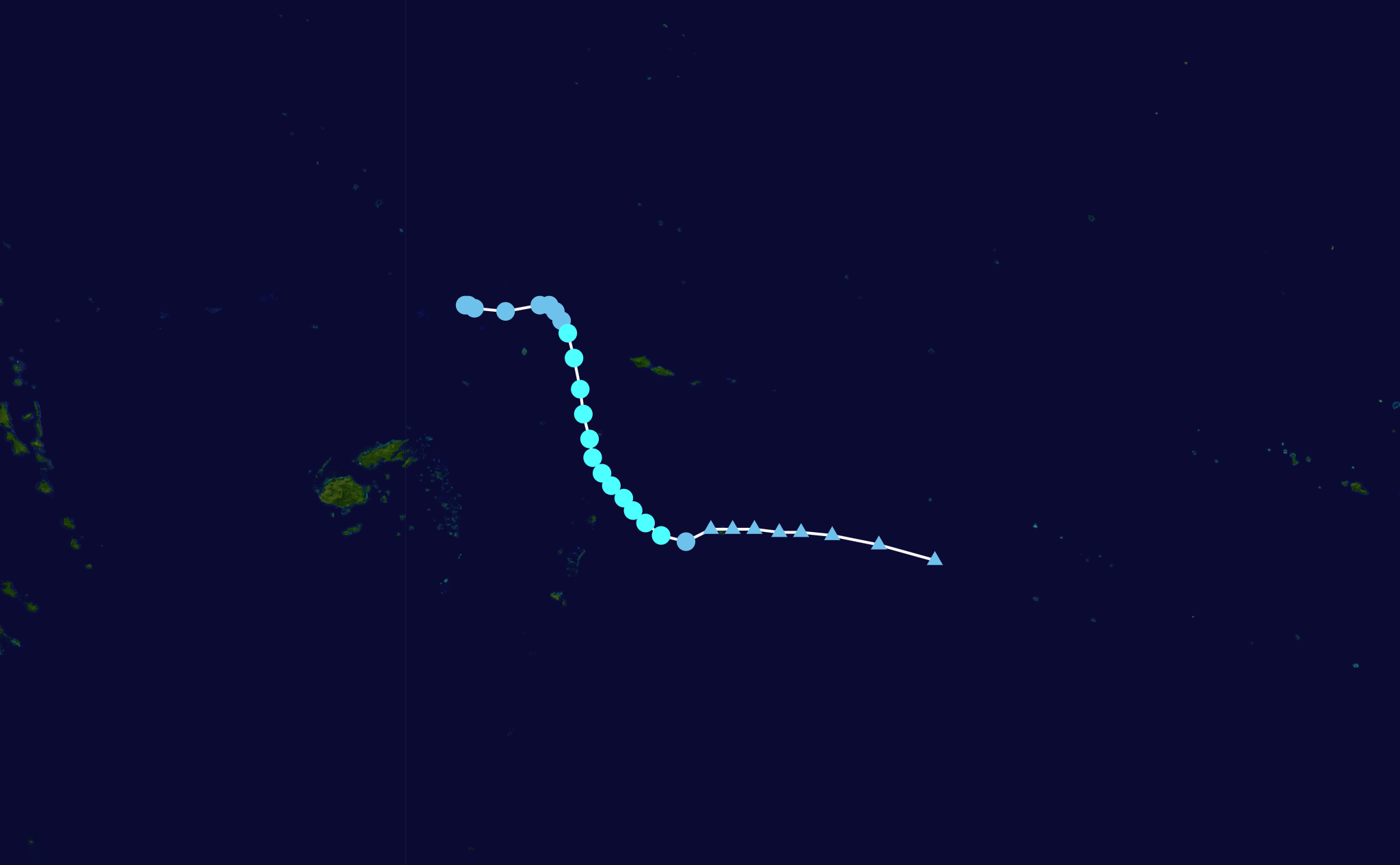
- Duration: January 9 – January 16
- Peak intensity: 85 km/h (50 mph) (10-min); 987 hPa (mbar)

Tropical Cyclone Drena existed from January 9 to January 16.

=== Severe Tropical Cyclone Eric ===
- Category 3 severe tropical cyclone (Australian scale)
- Category 3 tropical cyclone (SSHWS)
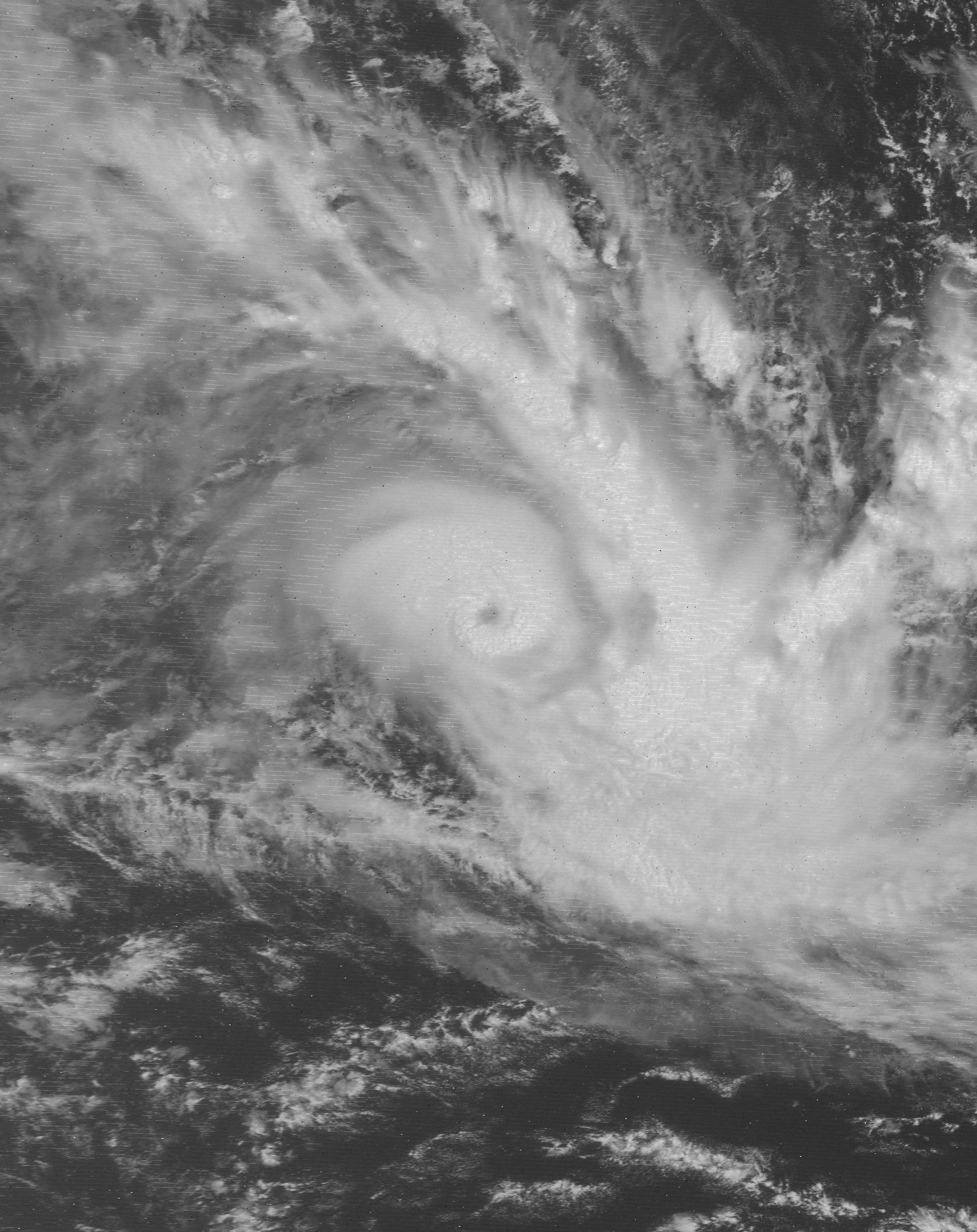
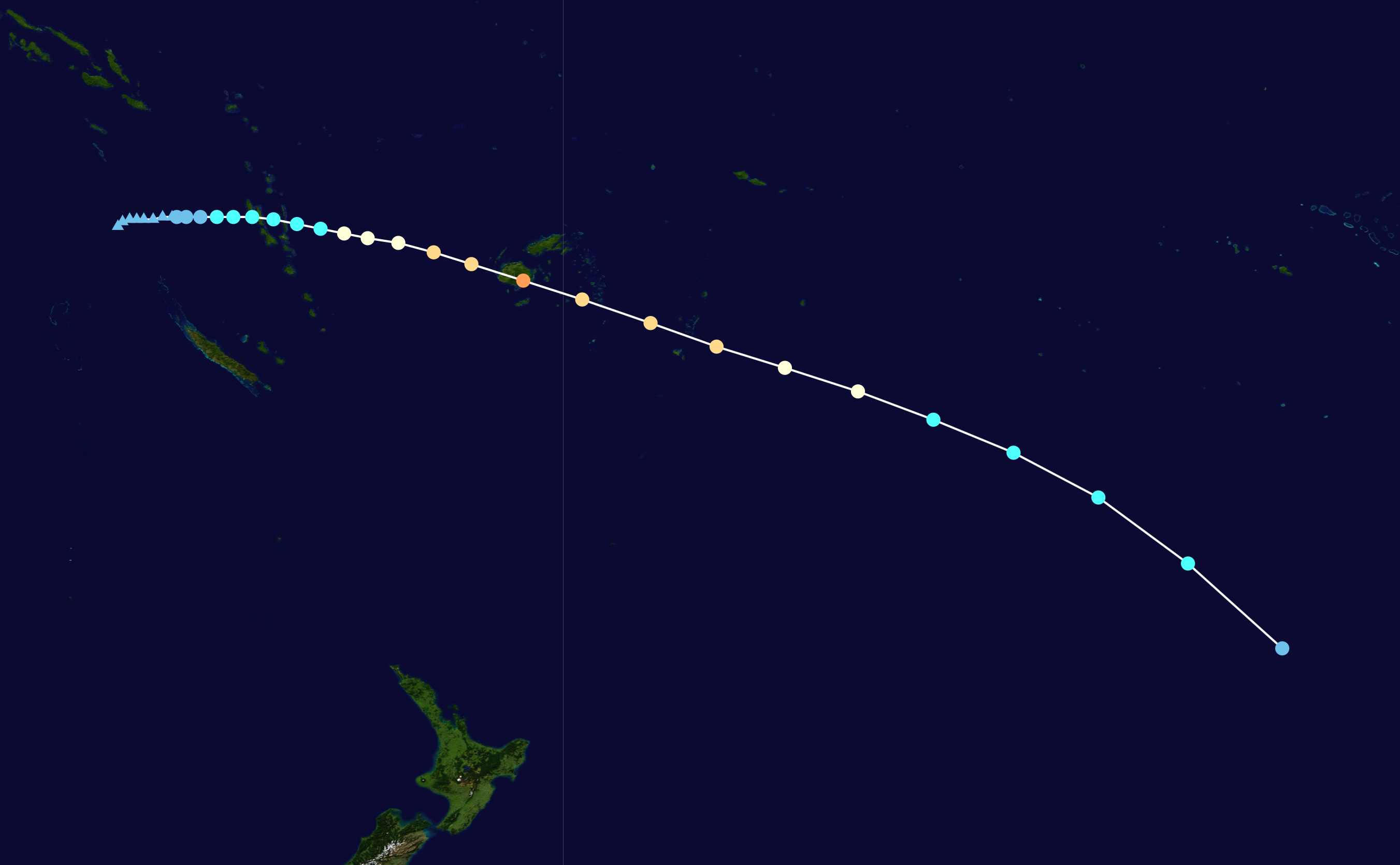
- Duration: January 13 – January 20
- Peak intensity: 150 km/h (90 mph) (10-min); 955 hPa (mbar)

On January 13, TCWC Nadi started to monitor a shallow depression that had developed within the monsoon trough about 725 km (450 mi) to the west of Espiritu Santo, Vanuatu. Over the next day the system moved eastwards and developed further as gale-force winds developed near the systems centre before the JTWC initiated advisories on the system and designated it as Tropical Cyclone 11P during January 14. The system was subsequently named Eric by TCWC Nadi as it moved closer to Espiritu Santo and became equivalent to a category 1 tropical cyclone. During January 15, Eric passed near or over Espiritu Santo, as it continued to intensify before it turned and accelerated south-eastwards. Eric subsequently became equivalent to a category 3 severe tropical cyclone early the next day, before an Air Pacific flight from Fiji to the Solomon Islands located the systems eye on radar.

During January 17, Eric's well defined eye came into the range of Nadi airports surveillance radar, before TCWC Nadi estimated that Eric had peaked with 10-minute sustained wind-speeds of 150 km/h (90 mph). During that day Eric's eye seemed to contract to around 15 km (10 mi) as it made passed through Fiji's Western Division and made landfall on the Fijian main island of Viti Levu about 10 km (5 mi) to the south of Nadi. After the system had made landfall, the JTWC estimated that Eric had peaked with 1-minute sustained wind speeds of 185 km/h (115 mph), which made it equivalent to a category 3 hurricane on the SSHWS.The system subsequently passed near or over Fiji's capital: Suva before emerging into the Korro Sea and weakening. Eric subsequently passed through the Tonga's Ha'apai islands just to the south of Nomuka during January 18, before it gradually weakened and was last noted during January 20, over 1,800 km (1,120 mi) to the south of Papeete, French Polynesia.

=== Severe Tropical Cyclone Nigel ===
- Category 3 severe tropical cyclone (Australian scale)
- Category 3 tropical cyclone (SSHWS)
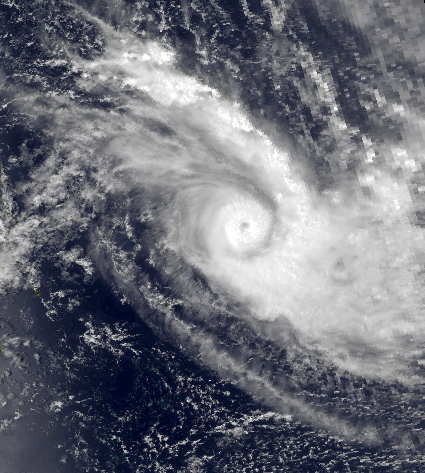
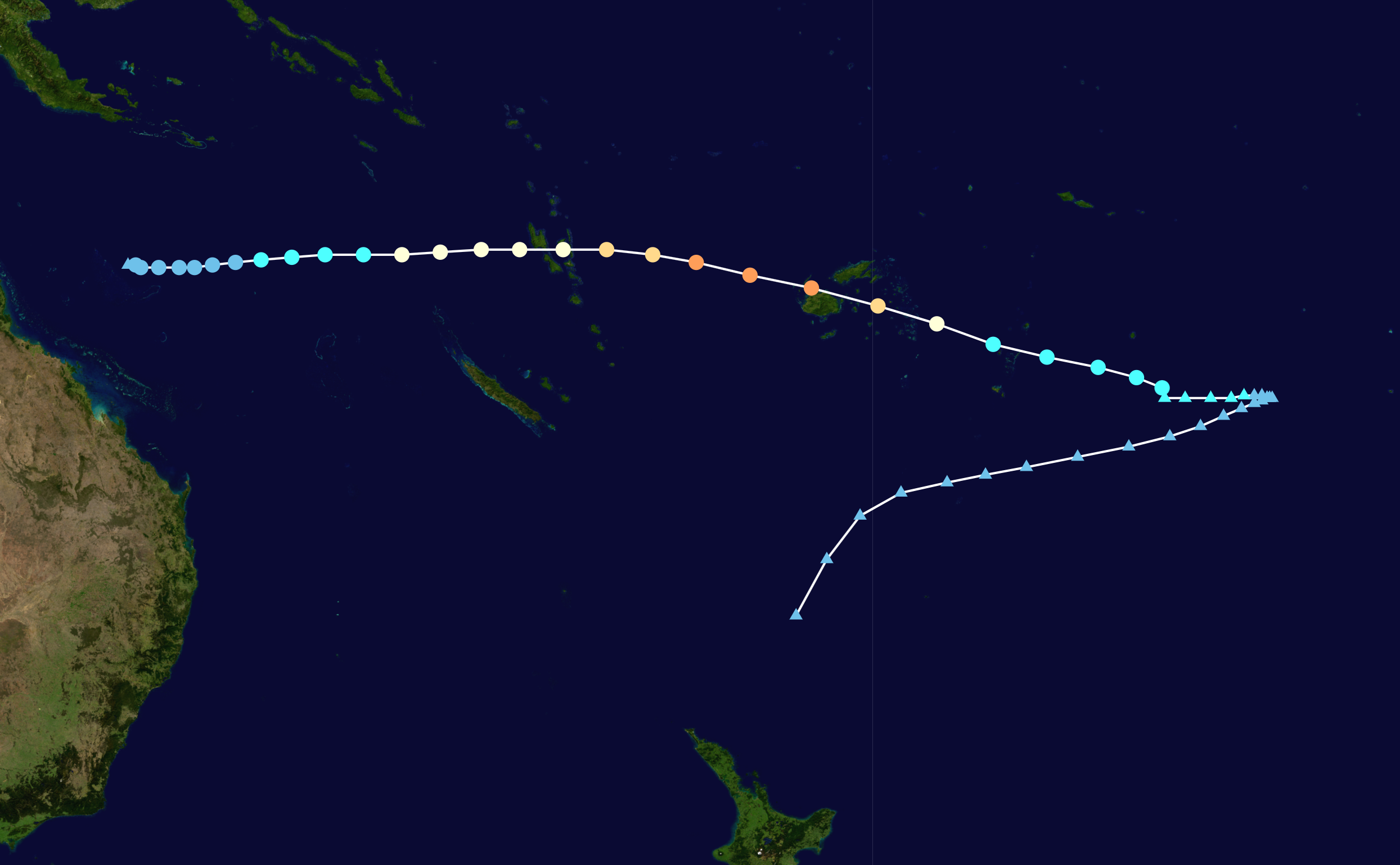
- Duration: January 16 (Entered basin) – January 28
- Peak intensity: 150 km/h (90 mph) (10-min); 955 hPa (mbar)

Late on January 16, Tropical Cyclone Nigel moved into the South Pacific basin from the Australian region. During the next day the system continued to move eastwards and developed an eye, before it became equivalent to a modern-day category 3 severe tropical cyclone.

=== Severe Tropical Cyclone Odette ===
- Category 4 severe tropical cyclone (Australian scale)
- Category 2 tropical cyclone (SSHWS)
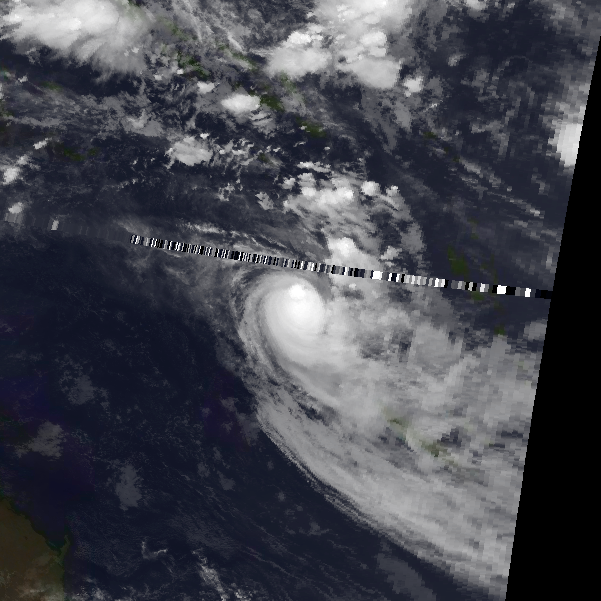
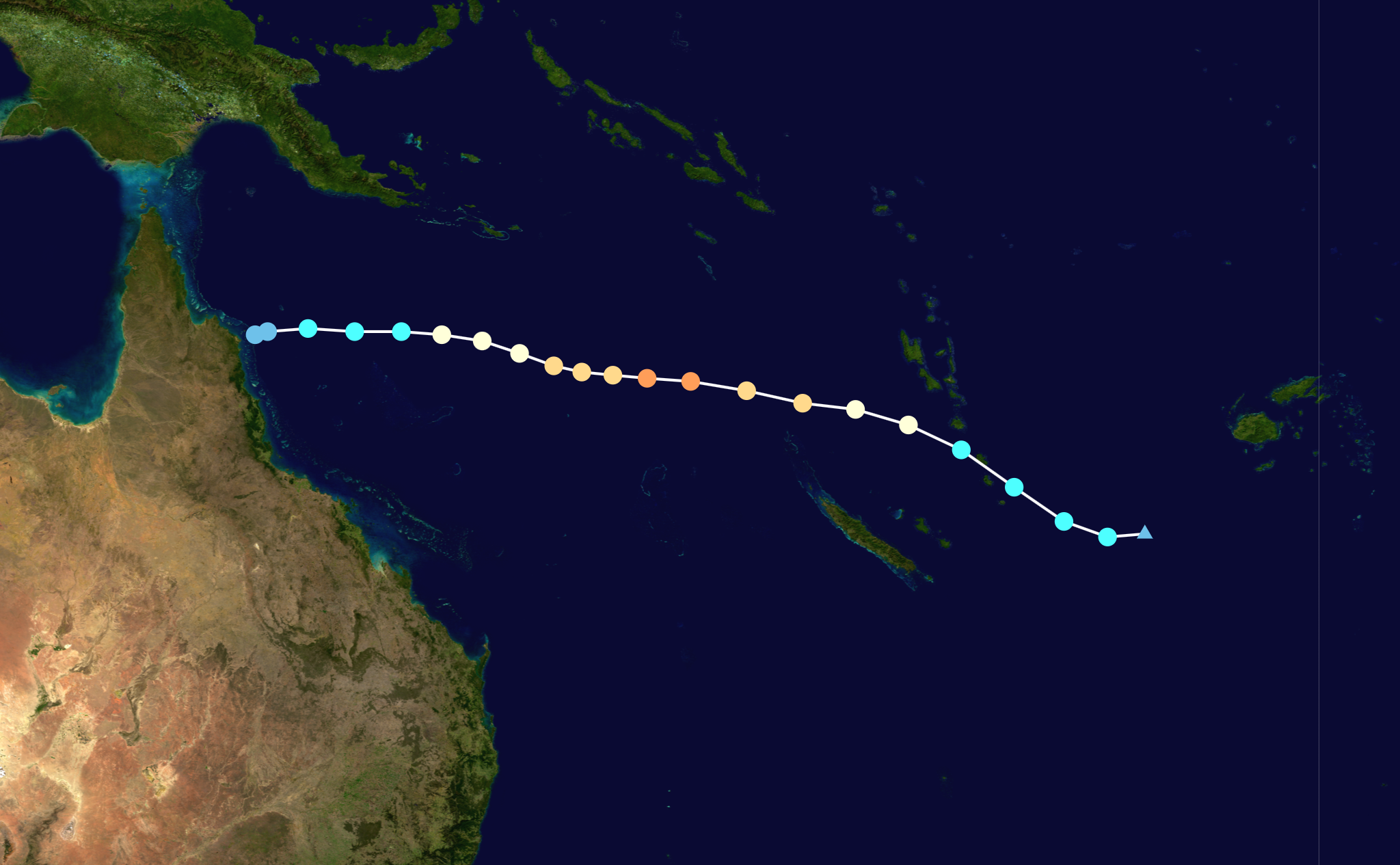
- Duration: January 19 (Entered basin) – January 21
- Peak intensity: 165 km/h (105 mph) (10-min); 936 hPa (mbar)

At approximately 1300 UTC on January 19, Severe Tropical Cyclone Odette crossed into the South Pacific Basin from the Australian region.

=== Severe Tropical Cyclone Freda ===
- Category 3 severe tropical cyclone (Australian scale)
- Category 1 tropical cyclone (SSHWS)
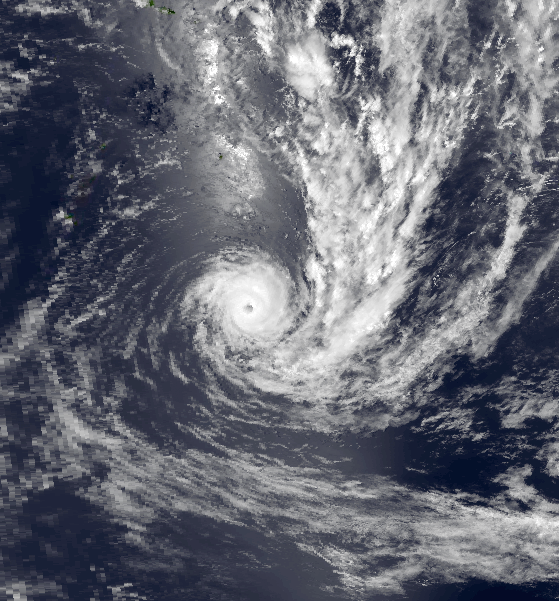
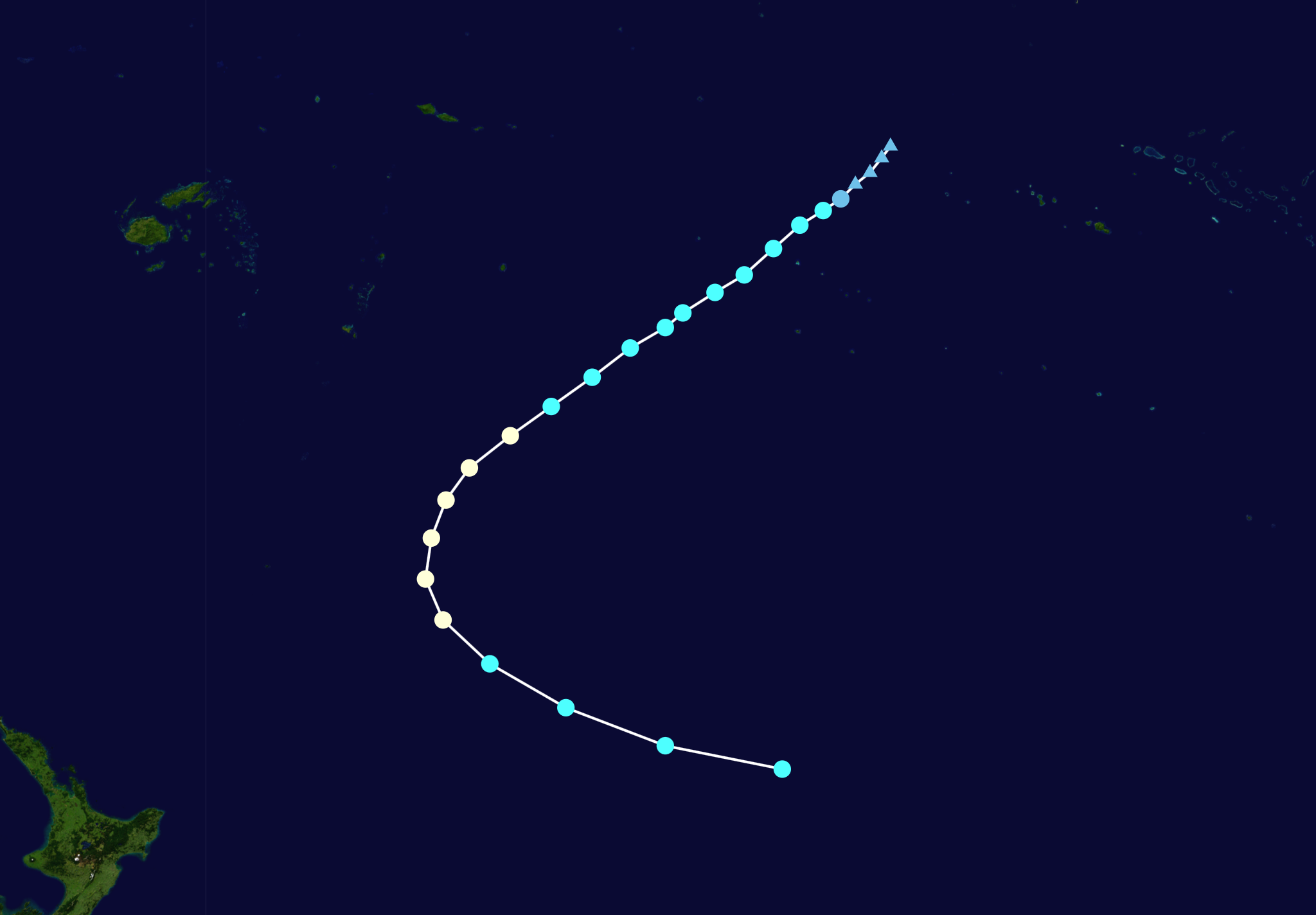
- Duration: January 25 – January 30
- Peak intensity: 150 km/h (90 mph) (10-min); 955 hPa (mbar)

During January 26, the FMS reported that a depression was located within the vicinity of the Southern Cook Islands about 150 km (95 mi) to the west-northwest of the island of Aitutaki.

=== Tropical Cyclone Gavin ===
- Category 2 tropical cyclone (Australian scale)
- Tropical storm (SSHWS)
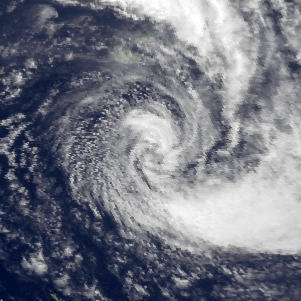
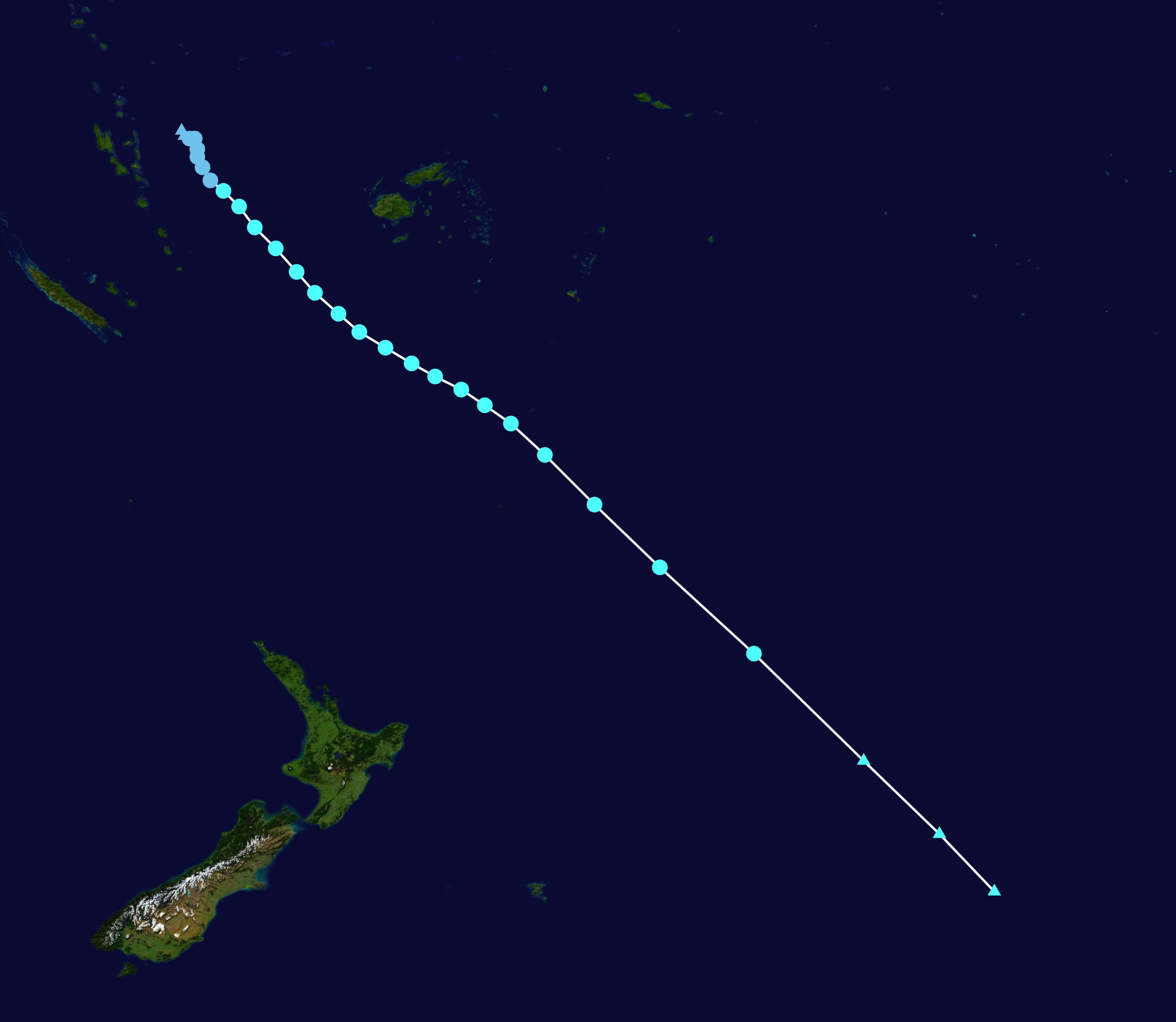
- Duration: March 2 – March 8
- Peak intensity: 95 km/h (60 mph) (10-min); 985 hPa (mbar)

During March 2, the Fiji Meteorological Service reported that a tropical depression had developed within a monsoon trough, in between Espiritu Santo and Rotuma about 450 km (280 mi) to the northwest of Fiji. Over the next couple of days, the system gradually developed further as it moved southwards, while moderate to strong winds were recorded in Vanuatu's southern islands of Aneityum and Tanna. During March 4, the United States Joint Typhoon Warning Center initiated advisories on the depression and designated it as Tropical Cyclone 27P, while the system was located about 300 km (185 mi) to the northeast of Port Vila in Vanuatu. Later that day the FMS named the system Gavin, after it had become equivalent to a category 1 tropical cyclone on the modern day Australian tropical cyclone intensity scale. At this time, Gavin was estimated to have an unusually large area of gale-force winds, with winds extending out to about 550 km (340 mi) in its northern semicircle and 280 km (175 mi) in its southern semicircle. During March 5, the system intensified slightly and attained storm-force winds as it moved south-eastwards, before the FMS reported that Gavin had peaked as a category 2 tropical cyclone with 10-minute sustained winds of 95 km/h (60 mph). Over the next couple of days, as the system moved south-eastwards brushed Fiji, there were no significant changes in Gavin's intensity, however, the wider area of gales moved into the system's semicircle. During March 7, the JTWC reported that the system had peaked with 1-minute sustained wind speeds of 100 km/h (65 mph), before Gavin started to weaken and lose its tropical characteristics, as it accelerated south-eastwards towards higher latitudes. Later that day, the FMS handed the primary warning responsibility for the system to the New Zealand Meteorological Service (NZMS), after Gavin had moved out of their area of responsibility. During March 8, the NZMS reported that the system had become an extratropical depression after it had lost most of its tropical characteristics, before it was last noted during the following day, while it was located about 2,100 km (1,305 mi) to the southeast of Wellington in New Zealand.

=== Severe Tropical Cyclone Hina ===
- Category 5 severe tropical cyclone (Australian scale)
- Category 4 tropical cyclone (SSHWS)
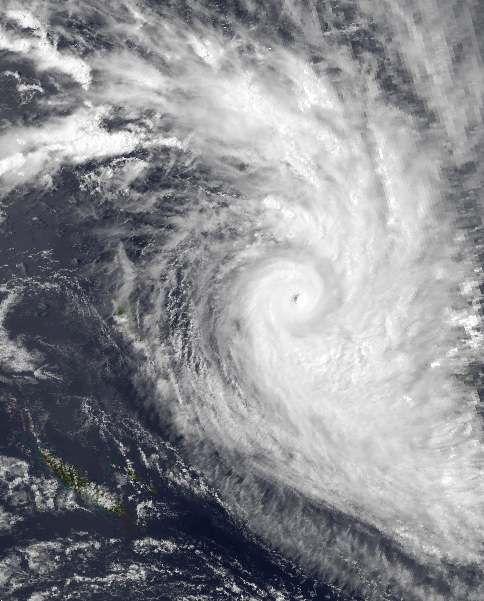
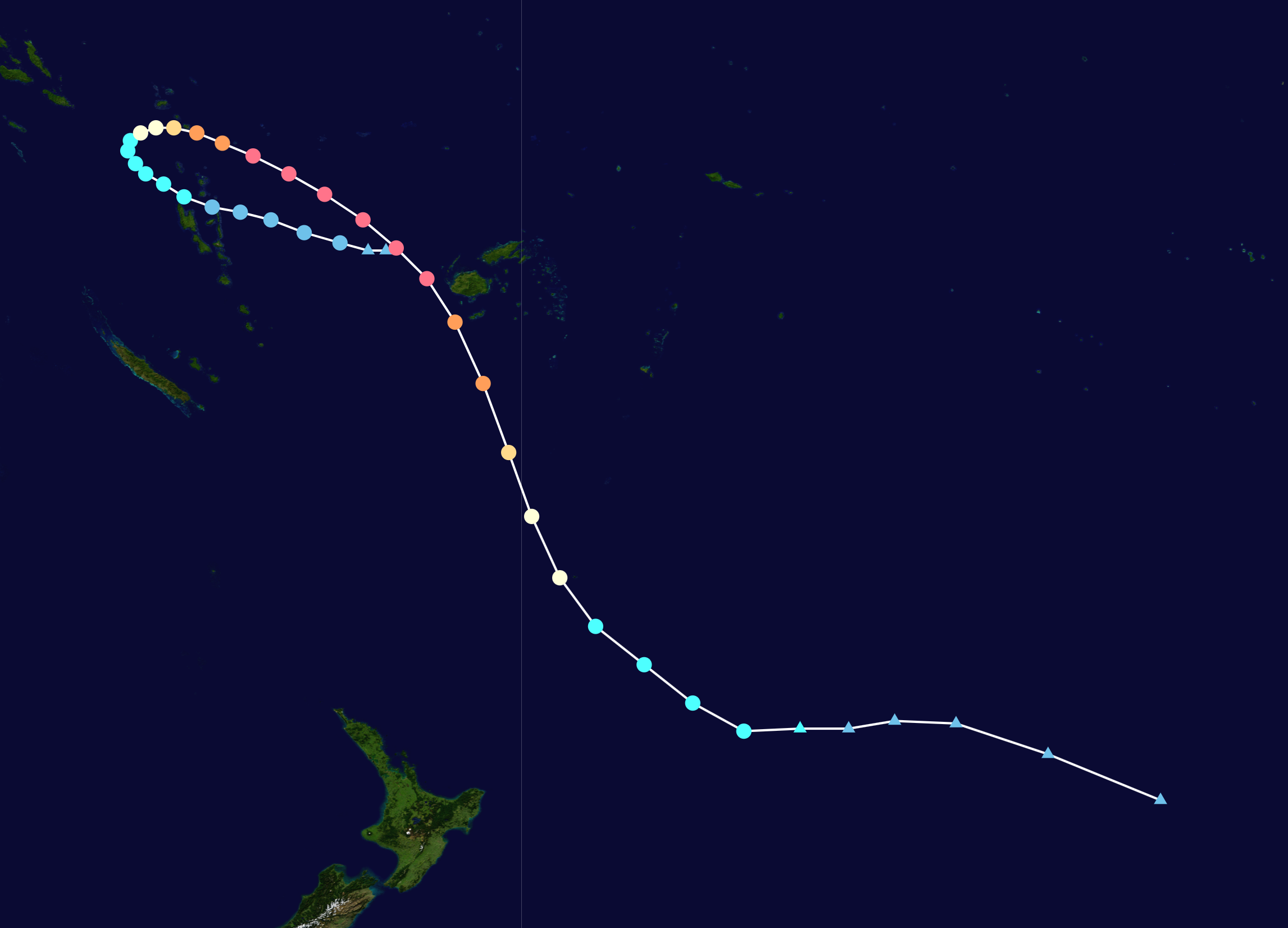
- Duration: March 11 – March 20
- Peak intensity: 220 km/h (140 mph) (10-min); 910 hPa (mbar)

Hina was one of the most intense tropical cyclones recorded in the South Pacific basin. Featuring well-defined rainbands, strong upper-level outflow, low vertical wind shear, and exceptionally warm sea-surface temperatures, Hina underwent a period of explosive deepening, characterized by rapid intensification. The cyclone continued tracking southward before encountering increasingly unfavorable environmental conditions and undergoing an eyewall replacement cycle, which contributed to its weakening into a tropical storm. As its circulation became increasingly disorganized and the center lost definition, Hina eventually weakened below tropical-storm intensity and became a tropical depression. Its remaining circulation subsequently dissipated.

=== Other system ===
According to the JTWC, Tropical Depression 08P formed on 26 December. On 28 December, 08P reached tropical storm status, and would later dissipate south of Fiji.

== Season effects ==
This table lists all the storms that developed in the South Pacific basin during the 1984–85 season. It includes their intensity on the Australian Tropical cyclone intensity scale, duration, name, areas affected, deaths, and damages.

Name	Dates	Peak intensity			Areas affected	Damage (USD)	Deaths	Ref(s).
Name	Dates	Category	Wind speed	Pressure	Areas affected	Damage (USD)	Deaths	Ref(s).
Unnamed	December 26–28	Category 1 tropical cyclone	85 km/h (50 mph)	987 hPa (29.15 inHg)		None	None	
Monica	December 28 – January 3	Category 2 tropical cyclone	110 km/h (70 mph)	975 hPa (28.79 inHg)	New Caledonia	None	None	
Drena	January 9–16	Category 1 tropical cyclone	85 km/h (50 mph)	987 hPa (29.15 inHg)				
Eric	January 14–20	Category 3 severe tropical cyclone	150 km/h (90 mph)	955 hPa (28.20 inHg)	Vanuatu, Fiji, Tonga	40 million	27	
Nigel	January 16–28	Category 3 severe tropical cyclone	75 km/h (45 mph)	955 hPa (28.20 inHg)	Vanuatu, Fiji, Tonga	40 million	27	
Odette	January 19–21	Category 3 severe tropical cyclone	165 km/h (105 mph)	960 hPa (28.35 inHg)	Vanuatu	Minor	None	
Freda	January 25–30	Category 3 severe tropical cyclone	150 km/h (90 mph)	955 hPa (28.20 inHg)				
Gavin	March 2–9	Category 2 tropical cyclone	95 km/h (60 mph)	985 hPa (29.09 inHg)	Vanuatu, Fiji		7	
Hina	March 11–20	Category 5 severe tropical cyclone	220 km/h (140 mph)	910 hPa (26.87 inHg)	Solomon Islands, Vanuatu, Fiji		3	
Season aggregates
9 systems	December 26 – March 20		220 km/h (140 mph)	910 hPa (26.87 inHg)		$40 million	37	

== See also ==
- Weather of 1985
- Atlantic hurricane seasons: 1984, 1985
- Pacific hurricane seasons: 1984, 1985
- Pacific typhoon seasons: 1984, 1985
- North Indian Ocean cyclone seasons: 1984, 1985
- 1984–85 South-West Indian Ocean cyclone season
- 1984–85 Australian region cyclone season
