= 1985 Bangladesh cyclone =

North Indian Ocean cyclone in 1985

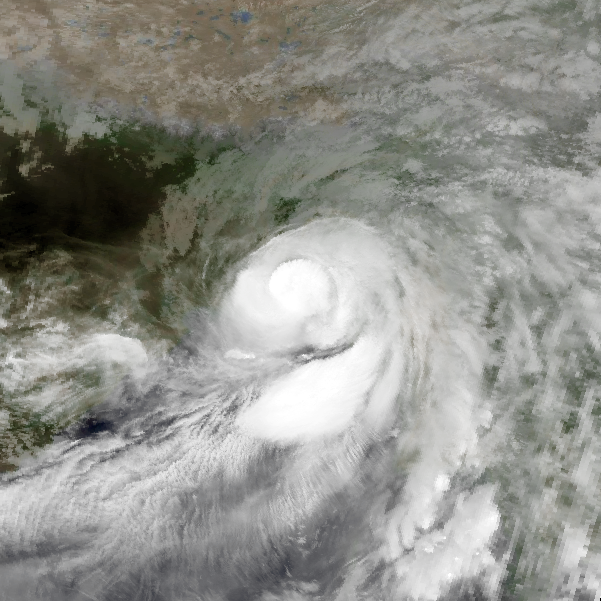
- One at peak intensity making landfall in Bangladesh.

Meteorological history
- Formed: May 22, 1985
- Dissipated: May 25, 1985

Very severe cyclonic storm
- 3-minute sustained (IMD)
- Highest winds: 120 km/h (75 mph)
- Lowest pressure: 979 hPa (mbar); 28.91 inHg

Tropical storm
- 1-minute sustained (SSHWS/JTWC)
- Highest winds: 110 km/h (70 mph)

Overall effects
- Fatalities: 11,069
- Damage: $18.5 million (1985 USD)
- Areas affected: Bangladesh, India, and Myanmar
- Part of the 1985 North Indian Ocean cyclone season

The 1985 Bangladesh cyclone was a mainly weak but extremely deadly and catastrophic tropical cyclone which developed in the central Bay of Bengal on May 22, strengthened to a peak of 70 mph winds before hitting Bangladesh on the 25th. The storm brought torrential rains and flooding, killing around 11,069 people and leaving hundreds of thousands homeless.

== Meteorological history ==
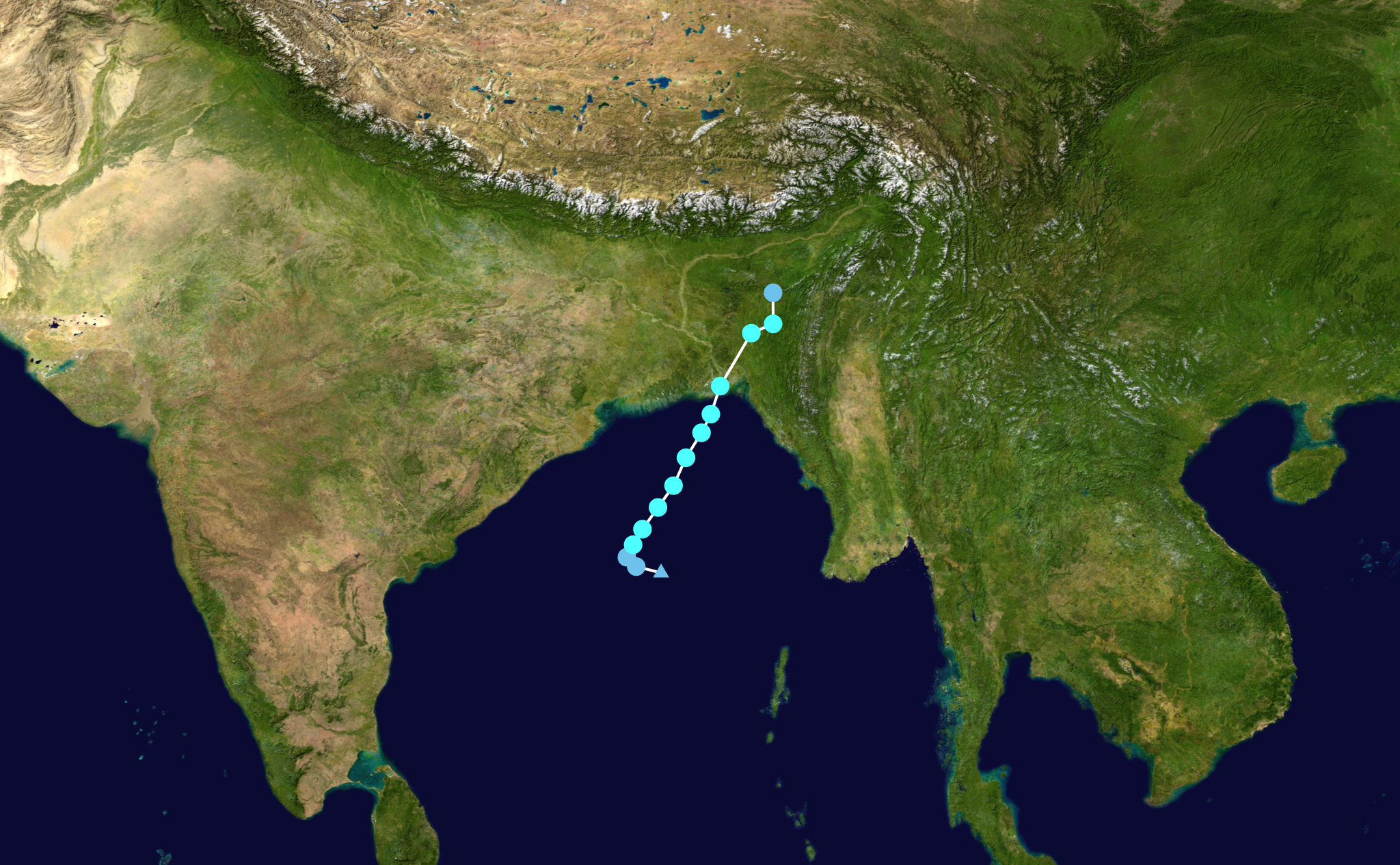
Map plotting the storm's track and intensity, according to the Saffir–Simpson scale Map key Saffir–Simpson scale Tropical depression (≤38 mph, ≤62 km/h) Tropical storm (39–73 mph, 63–118 km/h) Category 1 (74–95 mph, 119–153 km/h) Category 2 (96–110 mph, 154–177 km/h) Category 3 (111–129 mph, 178–208 km/h) Category 4 (130–156 mph, 209–251 km/h) Category 5 (≥157 mph, ≥252 km/h) Unknown Storm type Tropical cyclone Subtropical cyclone Extratropical cyclone, remnant low, tropical disturbance, or monsoon depression

On May 22, a depression formed in the Bay of Bengal, it rapidly intensified to a tropical storm on May 24, it made landfall and dissipated on May 25. The center of the cyclone was located in north Bay of Bengal close to the Ganga-Meghna estuary where the water was very shallow giving rise to a high storm surge.

== Impact and aftermath ==
As tropical storm one made landfall in Bangladesh, it brought winds of 70 mph and a storm surge up to 3 meters high and heavy torrential rains and flooding, killing around 11,069 people. Every single person on the island of Urir Char, approximately 500 at the time, is thought to have been swept into the Bay of Bengal. A pilot who flew over the island said it was swept by waves, like it was inside the fireball on an atomic bomb. A total of 1.3 million people were affected. Approximately 137,000 homes were damaged, 102,000 of them were destroyed, 133,00 acres of crops damaged, and 120,000 cattle were killed. The country was relying on a few air force helicopters and some vessels to transport supplies to the survivors of the affected region and it was stated that many areas were still not reachable.

== International assistance ==
After the cyclone passed, other nations began helping.

UNDRO: Emergency grant $30,000

UNDP: Emergency grant $30,000

Ireland: For emergency relief $15,088.24, for rehabilitation $30,176.49, Total $45,263.45

USA: Cash $25,000

Red cross (FED.REP. Germany: cash $96,774

Shipbuilding Foundation Ryokhi Ssawaka (Japan): cash $40,000

== See also ==
- 1985 North Indian Ocean cyclone season
- 1991 Bangladesh cyclone (1991) – An extremely powerful and deadly cyclone that made landfall in Bangladesh on April 29, 1991, with a peak of 160 mph on the coast of Chittagong.
- 1988 Bangladesh cyclone (1988) – A powerful and extremely deadly cyclone that made landfall on the coast of Khulna Division with a peak of 130 mph.
- Cyclone Sidr (2007) – An extremely powerful and deadly cyclone that made landfall near Mongla with a peak of 160 mph.
