= Weather of 1985 =

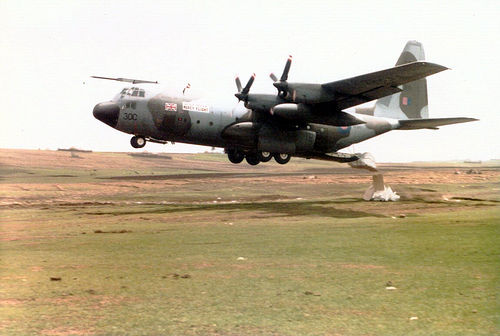
Royal Air Force C-130 airdropping food during the Ethiopia famine, the deadliest weather event of the year

The following is a list of weather events that occurred on Earth in the year 1985. The year began with a La Niña. The most common weather events to have a significant impact are blizzards, cold waves, droughts, heat waves, wildfires, floods, tornadoes, and tropical cyclones. The deadliest weather event of the year was the Ethiopia famine, which killed at least 400,000. The costliest weather event of the year was Hurricane Juan, which caused around $1.5 billion (Note: All damage totals are in 1985 USD) in damages in the Southern United States. Another significant weather event was the Bangladesh cyclone in May, which killed 11,069 people and damaged nearly 100,000 houses.

== Deadliest events ==
Deadliest meteorological events during 1985
| Rank | Event | Date(s) | Deaths | Refs |
|---|---|---|---|---|
| 1 | Ethiopian famine | Year long | >400,000 | |
| 2 | Bangladesh cyclone | May 22–25 | 11,069 | |
| 3 | Typhoon Cecil | October 11–17 | 770 | |
| 4 | Arrow Air Flight 1285R icing | December 12 | 256 | |
| 5 | Typhoon Jeff | July 21 – August 2 | 245 | |
| 6 | Typhoon Nelson | August 16–25 | 199–202 | |
| 7 | Puerto Rico floods | October 6–7 | 180 | |
| 8 | Delta Air Lines Flight 191 microburst | August 2 | 137 | |
| 9 | United States–Canada tornado outbreak | May 31 | 89 | |
| 10 | Typhoon Dot | October 13–22 | 83–90 | |

== Timeline ==
=== January ===
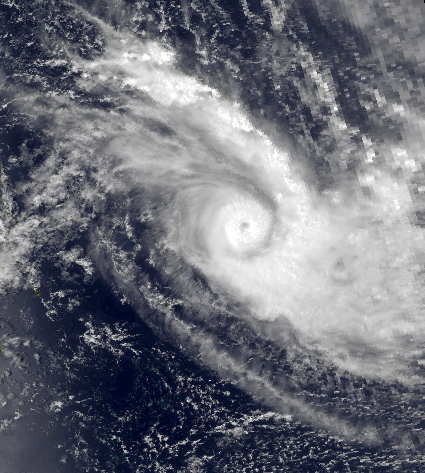
Cyclone Nigel at peak intensity on January 19

- January 12–22 – Two cyclones, Eric and Nigel, make landfall within a week of each other in Fiji. Between 23 and 28 people were killed and at least $39 million in damages were caused.

=== February ===
- February 1 – A winter storm in Alabama kills four people and builds up 28 cm (11 in) of ice, the largest amount since 1963.

=== March ===
- March 2–9 – Cyclone Gavin kills three people in Fiji.
- March 17 – An F3 tornado passes through Venice, Florida kills two people and causes $25 million in damages.

=== April ===
- April 5 – An F2 tornado near Tilden, Illinois kills one person.
- April 9 – Two tornadoes, one in Foshan, China and the other in Huaihua, kill 16 and 34 respectively.
- April 21 – An F3 tornado in Throckmorton County, Texas kills three people.
- April 28 – In Taylor County, Texas, an F2 tornado kills one.

=== May ===
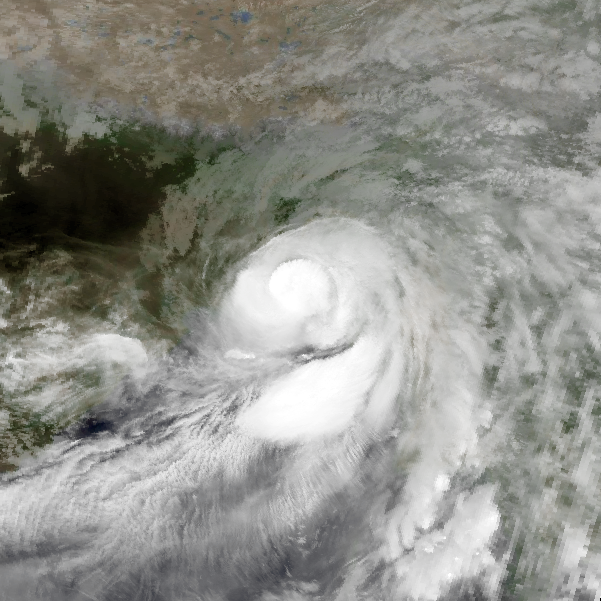
The Bangladesh cyclone soon before landfall in Bangladesh on 24 May

- May 22–25 – A cyclone makes landfall in Bangladesh, killing 11,069 people and damaging nearly 100,000 houses.
- May 29 – An FU tornado in Kornos, Cyprus kills one person.
- May 30 – A long-tracked tornadoes passes through Elkader, Iowa killing two and injuring 25.
- May 31 – June 1 – A historic tornado outbreak involving 44 tornadoes caused 89 deaths and over $600 million in property damage across Ohio, Pennsylvania, New York, and Ontario.
  - 12 people are killed and over 80 are injured in an F4 tornado in Albion, Pennsylvania
  - Another long-track F4 tornado kills 16 and injuries 125 in Crawford and Venango counties, Pennsylvania.
  - An F5 tornado tracks through Niles, Ohio and Wheatland, Pennsylvania, killing 18 people and injuring over 300.
  - An F4 tornado in Barrie, Ontario kills eight people and injuries over 100.

=== June ===
- June 8 – A long tracked F3 tornado in northern Wisconsin kills three people and causes $25 million in damages.
- June 8 – An F1 tornado in Menominee County, Michigan kills one person.
- June 19–27 – Typhoon Hal causes between 38 and 68 deaths in the Philippines, China, Hong Kong, and Taiwan.
- June 23 – July 1 – Between 49 and 89 people are killed and $80 million in damages are caused by Typhoon Irma in the Philippines and Japan.

=== July ===
- July 21 – August 2 – Typhoon Jeff brings the heaviest rain to Shanghai in 23, killing 245 in China.
- July 21–26 – Hurricane Bob leaves five dead in the Southern United States.
- July 31 – August 10 – Flooding from Typhoon Kit kills twelve people in South Korea.

=== August ===
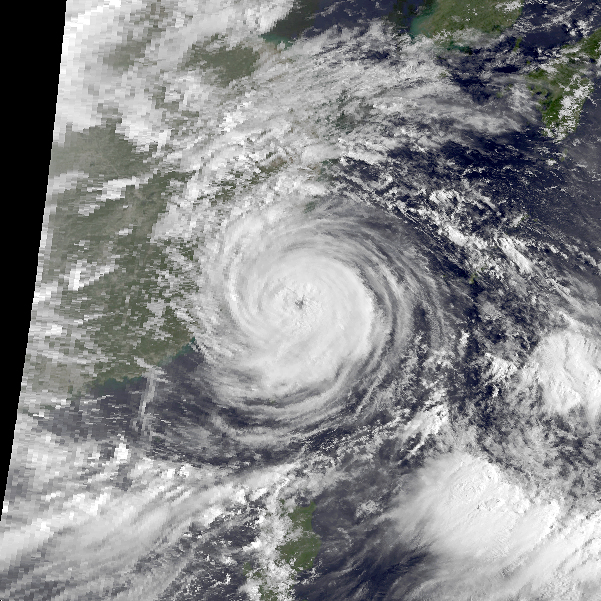
Typhoon Nelson soon after peak intensity on August 22

- August 2 – While on approach to Dallas/Fort Worth International Airport, a microburst impacted Delta Air Lines Flight 191, killing 136 on board and one more on the ground died.
- August 3 – An F1 tornado in Bari, Italy kills one person.
- August 9–14 – Tropical Storm Lee kills 26 people in the Korean Peninsula.
- August 12 – An F2 tornado passes near New Lisbon, Wisconsin, killing two.
- August 12–18 – Hurricane Danny kills five people along the Gulf Coast and the East Coast of the United States.
- August 15–21 – Typhoon Mamie is responsible for between 35 and 44 deaths in Eastern China.
- August 16 – An F2 tornado in Parrish, Alabama kills one.
- August 16–25 – Typhoon Nelson kills at least 199 people in Taiwan and Eastern China.
- August 24 – September 2 – Typhoon Pat kills 23 people in Japan.
- August 28 – September 4 – Hurricane Elena kills nine people and caused $1.3 billion in damages in the Southern United States.

=== September ===
- September 1–9 – Typhoon Tess leaves up to five dead in the Philippines and Hong Kong.
- September 16–27 – 14 people are killed and $900 million in damages are caused by Hurricane Gloria in the East Coast of the United States.
- September 22 – October 2 – Tropical Storm Andy kills 46 people in Vietnam.
- September 30 – October 5 – 71 people are killed in East Asia from Typhoon Brenda.

=== October ===
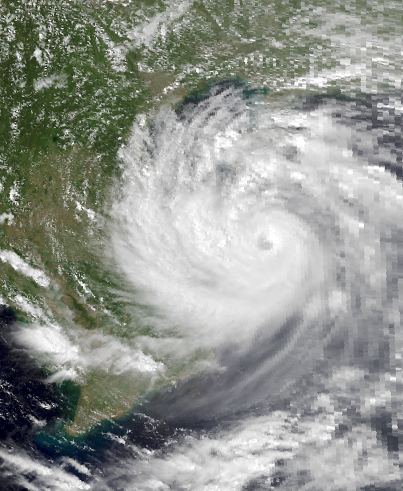
Typhoon Cecil soon before landfall in Vietnam on October 15

- October 6–7 – Flooding in Puerto Rico from a tropical wave kills 180.
- October 7–9 – Flooding from Hurricane Waldo in Kansas kills one person.
- October 11–17 – Typhoon Cecil kills 770 people in Vietnam and Thailand and damages or destroys 130,000 homes.
- October 13–22 – Between 83 and 90 people are killed and 250,000 homes are damaged or destroyed by Typhoon Dot in the Philippines and Southeast Asia.
- October 26 – November 1 – Hurricane Juan kills twelve people and causes $1.5 billion in damages across the Gulf Coast and interior United States.

=== November ===
- November 3–8 – Flooding in the Mid-Atlantic region of the United States kills 62 people and causes $1.4 billion in damages.
- November 15–23 – Hurricane Kate leaves 15 dead in Florida and Cuba while being one of only three hurricanes to make landfall in Florida in November.
- November 18 – In Marion County and Baxter County, Arkansas, an F3 tornado kills three people causes $25 million in damages.

=== December ===
- December 12 – Arrow Air Flight 1285R crashed shortly after takeoff from Gander International Airport, killing all 256 people on board. Cold weather caused ice to build up on the wings of the Douglas DC-8. As a result of the ice, as well as a combination of inappropriate takeoff speeds and a loss of thrust from the number four engine, the aircraft stalled and crashed into the forest.

== Notes ==
Global weather by year
| Preceded by 1984 | Weather of 1985 | Succeeded by 1986 |
