= Timeline of the 1985 Atlantic hurricane season =

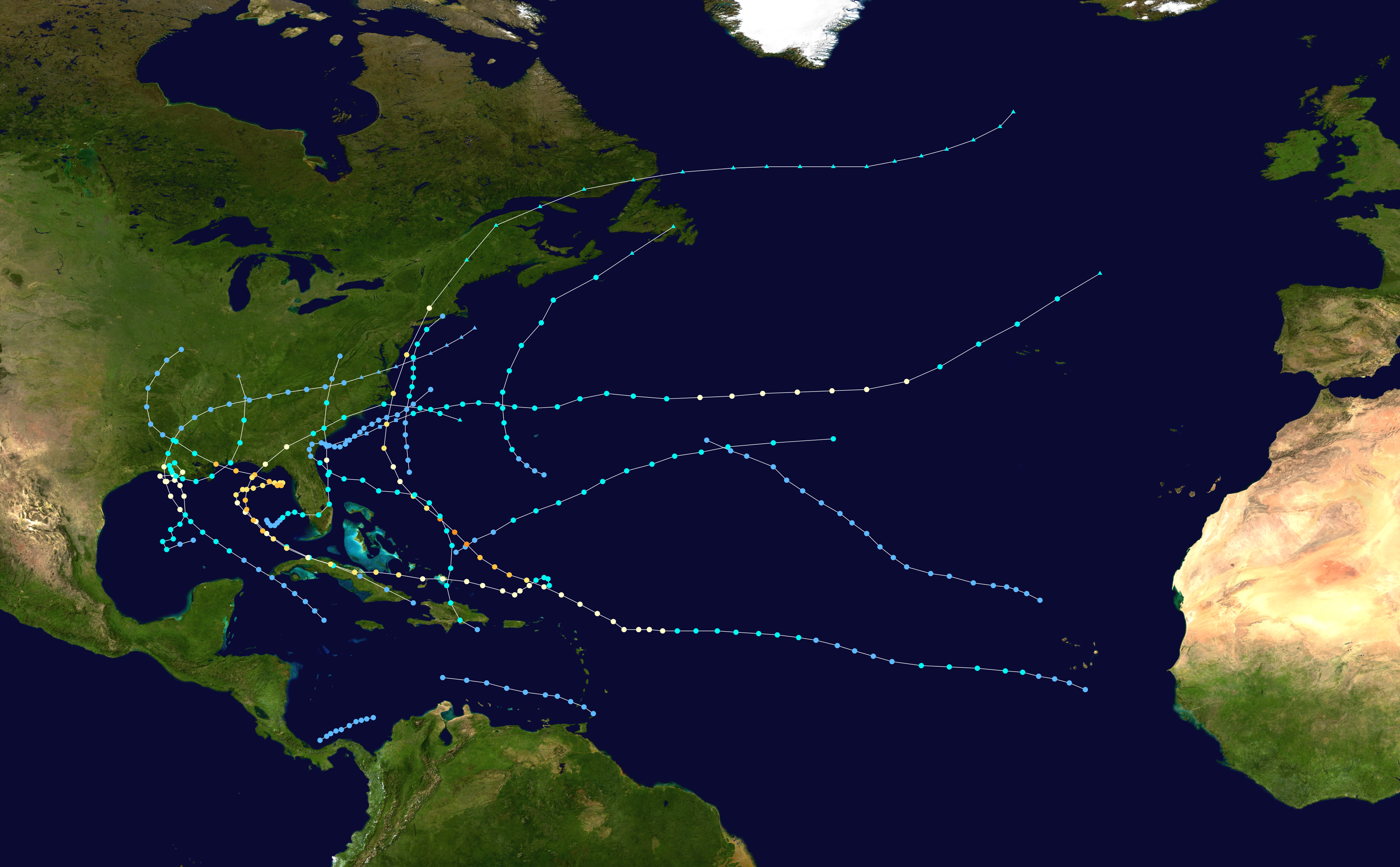
- Season summary map

Season boundaries
- First system formed: July 15, 1985
- Last system dissipated: December 9, 1985

Strongest system
- Name: Gloria
- Maximum winds: 145 mph (230 km/h) (1-minute sustained)
- Lowest pressure: 919 mbar (hPa; 27.14 inHg)

Longest lasting system
- Name: Gloria
- Duration: 11 days
Storm articles
- Hurricane Bob (1985)
- Hurricane Danny (1985)
- Hurricane Elena
- Hurricane Gloria
- Hurricane Juan (1985)
- Hurricane Kate (1985)

The 1985 Atlantic hurricane season was an event in the annual Atlantic hurricane season in the north Atlantic Ocean. It featured average activity overall, with thirteen tropical cyclones, eleven tropical storms, seven hurricanes, and three major hurricanes. The season officially began on June 1, 1985 and ended November 30, 1985. These dates, adopted by convention, historically describe the period in each year when most systems form. The season's first system, Tropical Storm Ana, developed on July 15; the season's final system, Tropical Depression Thirteen, dissipated on December 9. Eight tropical cyclones made landfall in the United States, including a record-tying six hurricanes (the most in a single year since 1916).

This timeline documents tropical cyclone formations, strengthening, weakening, landfalls, extratropical transitions, and dissipations during the season. It includes information that was not released throughout the season, meaning that data from post-storm reviews by the National Hurricane Center, such as a storm that was not initially warned upon, has been included.

The time stamp for each event is first stated using Coordinated Universal Time (UTC), the 24-hour clock where 00:00 = midnight UTC. The NHC uses both UTC and the time zone where the center of the tropical cyclone is currently located. The time zones utilized (east to west) prior to 2020 were: Atlantic, Eastern, and Central. In this timeline, the respective area time is included in parentheses. Additionally, figures for maximum sustained winds and position estimates are rounded to the nearest 5 units (miles, or kilometers), following National Hurricane Center practice. Direct wind observations are rounded to the nearest whole number. Atmospheric pressures are listed to the nearest millibar and nearest hundredth of an inch of mercury.

== Timeline ==
=== June ===
June 1

- The 1985 Atlantic hurricane season officially begins.

=== July ===
Tropical Storm Ana accelerating northeast near Nova Scotia on July 18

July 15

- 18:00 UTC (2:00 p.m. AST) – Tropical Depression One forms approximately 200 mi (320 km) south-southeast of Bermuda.

July 16

- 18:00 UTC (2:00 p.m. AST) – Tropical Depression One strengthens into Tropical Storm Ana about 120 mi (195 km) southwest of Bermuda.

July 19

- 00:00 UTC (8:00 p.m. AST, July 18) – Tropical Storm Ana achieves its peak intensity with maximum sustained winds of 70 mph (115 km/h) and a minimum barometric pressure of 996 mbar (hPa; 29.42 inHg) roughly 25 mi (40 km) northwest of Sable Island, Canada.
- 06:00 UTC (2:00 am AST) – Tropical Storm Ana transitions into an extratropical cyclone about 115 miles (185 km) east-southeast of Glace Bay, Nova Scotia.

July 21

- 06:00 UTC (2:00 a.m. EDT) – Tropical Depression Two forms over the southeastern Gulf of Mexico roughly 195 miles (314 km) west-southwest of Cape Coral, Florida.

July 22

- 18:00 UTC (2:00 p.m. EDT) – Tropical Depression Two strengthens into Tropical Storm Bob about 115 mi (185 km) west-southwest of Cape Coral, Florida.

July 23

- Between 12:00 and 18:00 UTC (between 8:00 a.m. and 2:00 p.m. EDT) – Tropical Storm Bob makes landfall near Bonita Springs, Florida with winds of 45 mph (70 km/h).

July 24

- 18:00 UTC (2:00 p.m. EDT) – Tropical Storm Bob intensifies into a Category 1 hurricane approximately 70 mi (115 km) east-northeast of Jacksonville, Florida.

Jul 25

- 00:00 UTC (8:00 p.m. EDT, July 24) – Hurricane Bob attains its peak intensity with winds of 75 miles per hour (121 km/h) and a minimum pressure of 102 mbar (hPa; 29.59 inHg roughly 50 mi (80 km) southeast of Savannah, Georgia.
- 03:00 UTC (11:00 pm EDT, July 24) – Hurricane Bob makes landfall near Beaufort, South Carolina, with winds of 75 mph (120 km/h).
- 06:00 UTC (2:00 am EDT) – Hurricane Bob weakens to a tropical storm about 45 mi (70 km) west-northwest of Charleston, South Carolina.
- 18:00 UTC (2:00 pm EDT) – Tropical Storm Bob degrades to a tropical depression roughly 40 mi (65 km) northwest of Greensboro, North Carolina.

July 26

- 00:00 UTC (8:00 pm EDT, July 25) – Tropical Depression Bob merges with a trough, marking its dissipation, over the Appalachian Mountains along the Virginia–West Virginia border.

=== August ===
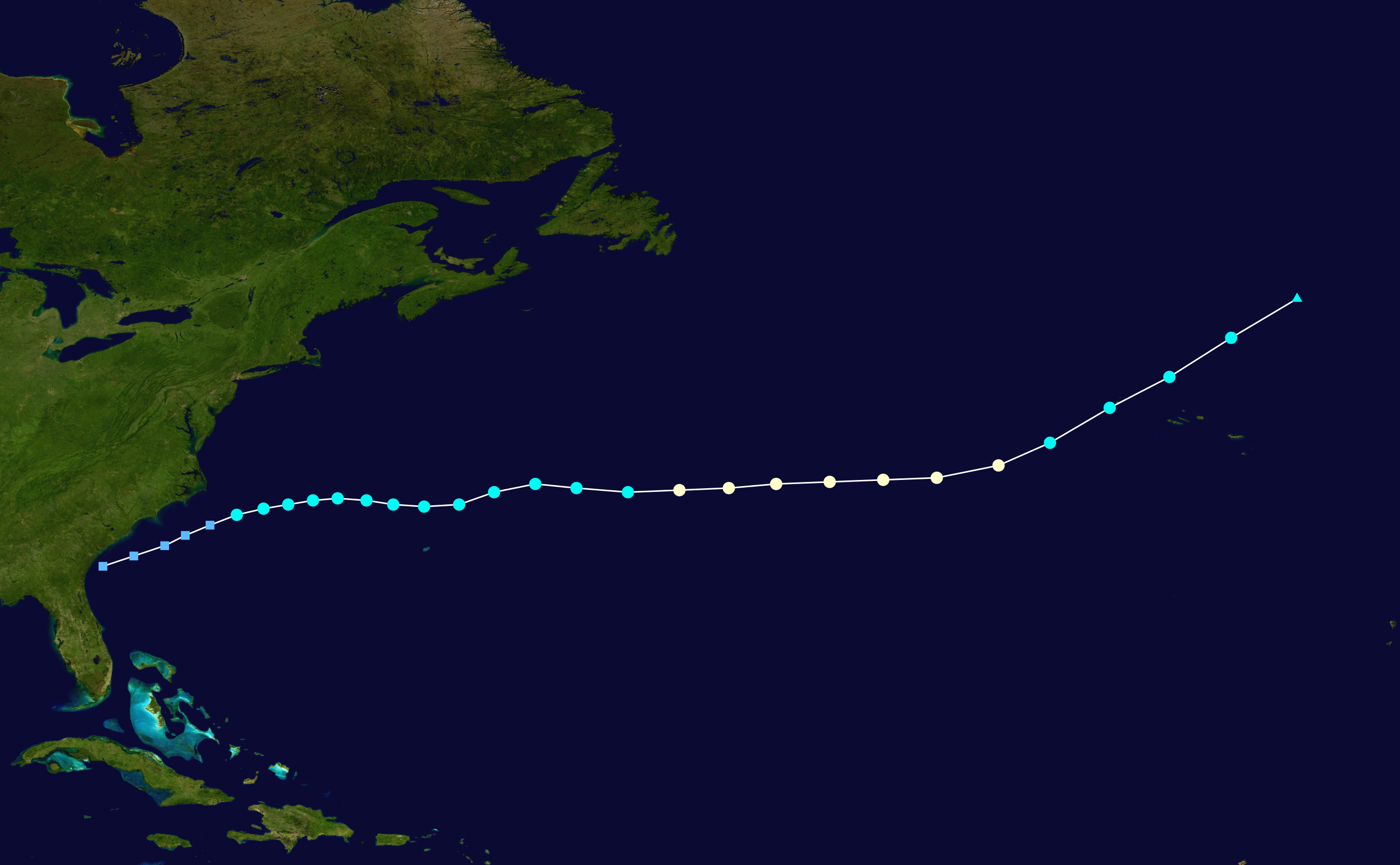
The trans-Atlantic track of Hurricane Claudette

August 9

- 18:00 UTC (2:00 p.m. EDT) – A subtropical depression develops about 50 mi (80 km) southeast of Savannah, Georgia.

August 9

- 00:00 UTC (8:00 p.m. EDT, August 8) – The subtropical depression acquires a warm core, spiral banding, and gale-force winds. This marks its transition into a tropical cyclone and simultaneous classification as Tropical Storm Claudette roughly 130 mi (210 km) southeast of Hatteras, North Carolina.

August 12

- 18:00 UTC (3:00 p.m. ADT) – Tropical Storm Claudette makes its closest approach to Bermuda, passing 145 mi (235 km) to the north.

August 12

- 00:00 UTC (8:00 p.m. EDT, August 11) – Tropical Depression Four forms about 65 mi (105 km) southeast of Grand Cayman, Cayman Islands.

August 13

- Around 06:00 UTC (2:00 a.m. EDT) – Tropical Depression Four brushes the Guanahacabibes Peninsula in Cuba before emerging over the Gulf of Mexico.

August 14

- 00:00 UTC (7:00 p.m. CDT, August 13) – Tropical Depression Four strengthens into Tropical Storm Danny roughly 450 mi (725 km) south-southeast of New Orleans.

August 14

- 06:00 UTC (3:00 a.m. ADT) – Tropical Storm Claudette attains hurricane-status about 725 mi (1,165 km) northeast of Bermuda.

August 15

Hurricane Danny over the northwestern Gulf of Mexico on August 15

- 00:00 UTC (7:00 p.m. CDT, August 14) – Tropical Storm Danny intensifies into a hurricane roughly 235 mi (380 km) southwest of New Orleans.
- 12:00 UTC (9:00 a.m. ADT) – Hurricane Claudette attains its peak intensity with winds of 85 mph (135 km/h) and a minimum pressure of 980 mbar (hPa; 29 inHg) approximately 540 mi (870 km) southwest of Flores Island, Azores.
- 16:20 UTC (11:20 a.m. CDT) – Hurricane Danny attains its peak intensity with winds of 90 mph (145 km/h) and a minimum pressure of 987 mbar (hPa; 29.1 inHg just southeast of Grand Chenier, Louisiana.
- 16:30 UTC (11:30 a.m. CDT) – Hurricane Danny makes landfall near Grand Chenier, Louisiana, with winds of 90 mph (145 km/h).

August 16

- 00:00 UTC (9:00 p.m. ADT, August 15) – Hurricane Claudette weakens to a tropical storm about 220 mi 350 km southwest of Flores Island, Azores.
- Around 06:00 UTC (3:00 a.m. ADT) – Tropical Storm Claudette passes close to or over Flores Island, Azores, with winds of 50 mph (80 km/h).
- 00:00 UTC (7:00 p.m. CDT, August 15) – Hurricane Danny weakens to a tropical storm roughly 20 mi (30 km) south of Alexandria, Louisiana.

August 17

- 00:00 UTC (9:00 p.m. ADT, August 16) – Tropical Storm Claudette transitions into an extratropical cyclone about 460 mi (740 km) north-northeast of Terceira Island, Azores.
- 12:00 UTC (7:00 a.m. CDT) – Tropical Storm Danny weakens to a tropical depression roughly 50 mi (80 km) northeast of Monroe, Louisiana.

August 19

- 00:00 UTC (8:00 p.m. EDT, August 18) – Tropical Depression Danny transitions into an extratropical cyclone about 20 mi (30 km) west of Emporia, Virginia.

August 28

- 00:00 UTC (8:00 p.m. EDT, August 27) – Tropical Depression Five forms over the Windward Passage between Cuba and Haiti
- Between 00:00 and 06:00 UTC (8:00 p.m. EDT, August 27 – 2:00 a.m. EDT, August 28) – Tropical Depression Five makes landfall near Cajobabo, Cuba, with winds of 35 mph (55 km/h).

August 28

- 18:00 UTC (2:00 p.m. EDT) – Tropical Depression Five strengthens into Tropical Storm Elena just southeast of Cifuentes, Cuba, while still over land.

August 29

- 00:00 UTC (8:00 p.m. EDT, August 28) – Tropical Storm Elena emerges over the Gulf of Mexico just north of Santa Cruz del Norte, Cuba.
- 12:00 UTC (8:00 a.m. EDT) – Tropical Storm Elena strengthens into a hurricane roughly 205 mi (330 km) west-northwest of Key West, Florida.

August 30

- 12:00 UTC (7:00 a.m. CDT) – Hurricane Elena attains Category 2 status approximately 195 mi (315 km) south-southeast of Mobile, Alabama.

=== September ===
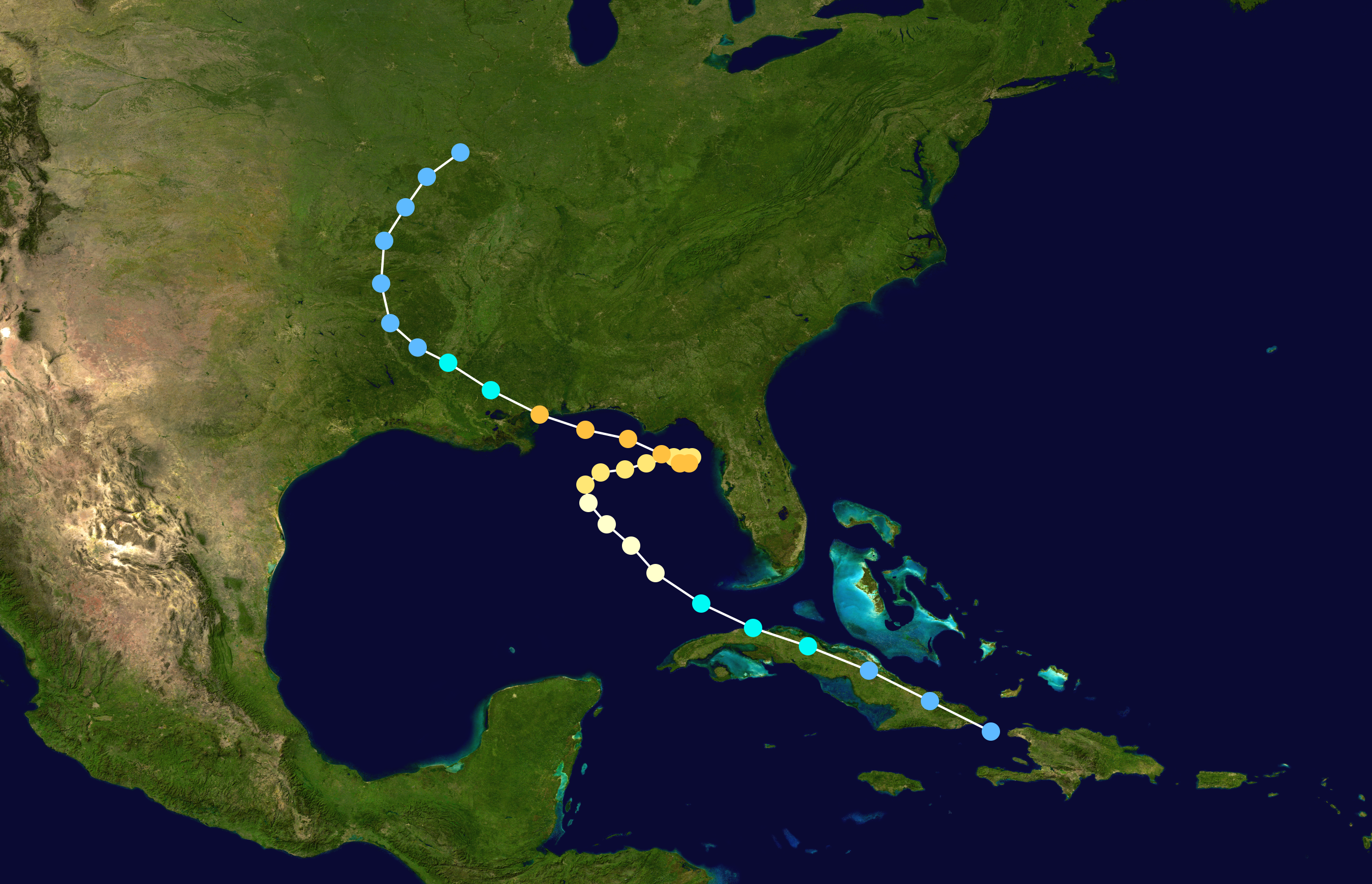
Hurricane Elena's unusual track across the northern Caribbean and eastern Gulf of Mexico

September 1

- 06:00 UTC (2:00 a.m. EDT) – Hurricane Elena strengthens into a Category 3 hurricane roughly 125 mi (200 km) south-southeast of Tallahassee, Florida as it executes an unusual clockwise loop over the northeastern Gulf of Mexico.

September 2

- 00:00 UTC (7:00 p.m. CDT, September 1) – Hurricane Elena attains its peak intensity with winds of 125 miles per hour (201 km/h) and a minimum pressure of 953 mbar (hPa; 28.1 inHg) about 50 miles (80 km) south-southwest of Panama City, Florida.

September 2

- 13:00 UTC (8:00 a.m. CDT) – Hurricane Elena makes landfall near Gulfport, Mississippi, with winds of 115 mph (185 km/h).
- 18:00 UTC (1:00 p.m. CDT) – Land interaction causes Hurricane Elena to rapidly weaken to tropical storm status about 15 mi (25 km) south of McComb, Mississippi.

September 3

- 06:00 UTC (1:00 a.m. CDT) – Tropical Storm Elena further degrades to a tropical depression roughly 15 mi (25 km) southwest of Ruston, Louisiana.

September 4

- 1800 UTC (1:00 p.m. CDT) – Tropical Depression Elena dissipates over eastern Missouri.

September 8

- 12:00 UTC (3:00 a.m. ADT) – An unnumbered tropical depressions develops about 230 mi (370 km) northwest of Santo Antão, Cape Verde.

September 9

- 06:00 UTC (3:00 a.m. ADT) – The unnumbered tropical depression attains its maximum winds of 35 mph (55 km/h) roughly 385 mi (620 km) northwest of Santo Antão, Cape Verde.

September 11

- 12:00 UTC (9:00 a.m. ADT) – Tropical Depression Six develops about 10 miles (16 km) north of Tobago.
- 18:00 UTC (3:00 p.m. ADT) – Tropical Depression Six attains its maximum sustained winds of 35 miles per hour (56 km/h) roughly 30 mi (50 km) east of Grenada.
- Between 18:00 and 00:00 UTC (3:00–9:00 p.m. ADT) – Tropical Depression Six makes landfall over Grenada with winds of 35 mph (55 km/h).

September 13

- 12:00 UTC (9:00 a.m. ADT) – The unnumbered tropical depression dissipates about 740 mi (1,195 km) east of Bermuda.
- 18:00 UTC (2:00 p.m. EDT) – Tropical Depression Six dissipates roughly 160 mi (255 km) northwest of Aruba.

September 15

- 1800 UTC (2:00 p.m. EDT) – Tropical Depression Seven developed 150 miles (240 km) north of Grand Turk Island.

=== October ===
October 7

- 1200 UTC (8:00 a.m. AST) – Tropical Depression Ten developed near the coastline of the Dominican Republic province of Puerto Plata.
- 1800 UTC (2:00 p.m. AST) – Tropical Depression Ten strengthens into Tropical Storm Isabel.

October 8

- 2100 UTC (5:00 p.m. AST) – Tropical Storm Isabel attains its peak intensity with winds of 70 mph (115 km/h) and a minimum pressure of 997 mbar (hPa; 29.4 inHg).

October 10

- 2100 UTC (5:00 p.m. EDT) – Tropical Storm Isabel made landfall near Fernandina Beach, Florida with winds of 40 mph (65 km/h).

October 11

- 0000 UTC (8:00 p.m. EDT October 10) – Tropical Storm Isabel weakens to a tropical depression.

October 15

- 1800 UTC (2:00 p.m. EDT) – Tropical Depression Isabel dissipated about 197 mi (317 km) east-southeast of Virginia Beach, Virginia.

October 26

- 0000 UTC (7:00 p.m. CDT October 25) – Tropical Depression Eleven developed about 250 mi (400 km) north-northwest of Mérida, Yucatán, Mexico.
- 1200 UTC (7:00 a.m. CDT) – Tropical Depression Eleven strengthens into Tropical Storm Juan.

October 28

- 0000 UTC (7:00 p.m. CDT October 27) – Tropical Storm Juan strengthens into a Category 1 hurricane.
- 1800 UTC (1:00 p.m. CDT) – Hurricane Juan attains its peak intensity with winds of 85 mph (135 km/h) and a minimum pressure of 971 mbar (hPa; 28.7 inHg).

October 29

- Shortly before 1200 UTC (7:00 a.m. CDT) – Hurricane Juan made landfall near Morgan City, Louisiana with winds of 80 mph (130 km/h).
- 1800 UTC (1:00 p.m.) – Hurricane Juan weakened to a tropical storm.

October 31

- 0600-1200 UTC (1:00–7:00 a.m. CDT) – Tropical Storm Juan made landfall in Plaquemines Parish, Louisiana with winds of 65 mph (105 km/h).

=== November ===
November 30

- The 1985 Atlantic hurricane season officially ends.

=== December ===
December 7

- 1200 UTC (8:00 am EDT) – Tropical Depression Thirteen developed about 140 mi (225 km) west-northwest of Puerto Colombia, Colombia.

December 8

- 1200 UTC (8:00 am EDT) – Tropical Depression Thirteen attained its peak winds of 35 miles per hour (56 km/h).

December 9

- 1800 UTC (2:00 pm EDT) – Tropical Depression Thirteen dissipated about 75 mi (120 km) west-northwest of Colón, Panama.

== See also ==
- Lists of Atlantic hurricanes
