= 1985 hurricane season =

1985 hurricane season may refer to:

- The 1985 Atlantic hurricane season
- The 1985 Pacific hurricane season
