= List of storms named Kate =

The name Kate has been used for nineteen tropical cyclones worldwide, five in the Atlantic Ocean, one in the central Pacific Ocean, ten in the western Pacific Ocean, and three in the Southern Hemisphere.

In the Atlantic:

- Hurricane Kate (1985) – Category 3 hurricane, grazed Cuba, directly struck Panama City, Florida
- Hurricane Kate (2003) – Category 3 hurricane, brushed Newfoundland
- Hurricane Kate (2015) – Category 1 hurricane, brushed the Bahamas
- Tropical Storm Kate (2021) – weak and disorganized tropical storm which stayed at sea

In the Central Pacific:

- Hurricane Kate (1976) – briefly threatened Hawaii

In the Western Pacific:

- Tropical Storm Kate (1945) – struck Japan
- Typhoon Kate (1951) (T5106) – affected Japan
- Typhoon Kate (1955) (T5521)
- Tropical Storm Kate (1959) (T5910, 20W)
- Typhoon Kate (1962) (T6206, 44W)
- Typhoon Kate (1964) (T6430, 45W) – struck Vietnam
- Typhoon Kate (1967) (T6719, 21W, Pepang)
- Typhoon Kate (1970) – killed 915 people in the Philippines
- Tropical Storm Kate (1973) (T7312, 13W)
- Typhoon Kate (1999) (T9901, 04W, Diding)

In the Southern Hemisphere:

- Cyclone Kate (1962) – South-West Indian Ocean cyclone that struck eastern Madagascar
- Cyclone Kate (2006) – short-lived (Australian region) Category 2 cyclone in the northwestern Coral Sea, not a threat to land
- Cyclone Kate (2014) – severe (Australian region) Category 4 cyclone that moved from the South-East Indian Ocean basin into the South-West Indian Ocean basin, not a threat to land
