= Hurricane Bob (1985) =

Category 1 Atlantic hurricane

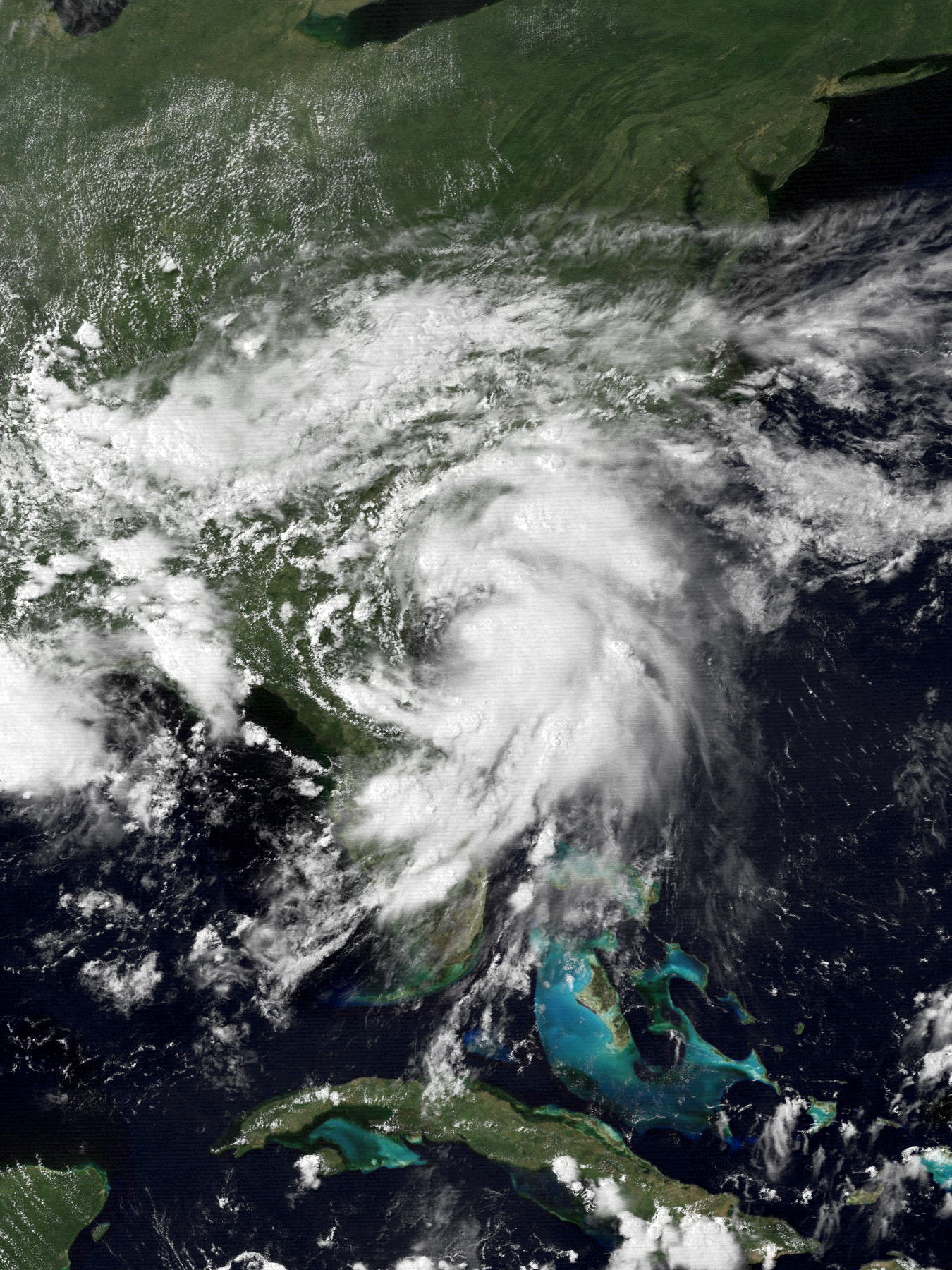
- Bob near peak intensity off the coast of Florida on July 24

Meteorological history
- Formed: July 21, 1985
- Dissipated: July 26, 1985

Category 1 hurricane
- 1-minute sustained (SSHWS/NWS)
- Highest winds: 75 mph (120 km/h)
- Lowest pressure: 1002 mbar (hPa); 29.59 inHg

Overall effects
- Fatalities: 5 indirect
- Damage: $20 million (1985 USD)
- Areas affected: Florida, Southeast United States, Mid-Atlantic, southern New England
- IBTrACS
- Part of the 1985 Atlantic hurricane season

Hurricane Bob was the first of six hurricanes to strike the United States during the 1985 Atlantic hurricane season. The second tropical storm and first hurricane of the year, Bob developed from a tropical wave on July 21 in the eastern Gulf of Mexico. Bob began moving east, making landfall southwestern Florida as a weak tropical storm. The storm then turned to the north and quickly intensified to hurricane status on July 24. The next day, it made landfall near Beaufort, South Carolina, becoming one of a record-tying six hurricanes to hit the United States during a single season. Bob quickly weakened over land, and was absorbed by a frontal trough over eastern West Virginia on July 26.

Bob caused $20 million in damage as well as five indirect deaths. In Florida, the storm produced heavy rainfall, peaking at over 20 inches (508 mm) in Everglades City. In most areas, the rainfall was beneficial due to dry conditions that had persisted throughout the year. Damage was minimal in South Carolina, where the hurricane made its final landfall. In Virginia, the storm spawned three tornadoes, one of which destroyed two houses.

== Meteorological history ==
Map plotting the storm's track and intensity, according to the Saffir–Simpson scale Map key Saffir–Simpson scale Tropical depression (≤38 mph, ≤62 km/h) Tropical storm (39–73 mph, 63–118 km/h) Category 1 (74–95 mph, 119–153 km/h) Category 2 (96–110 mph, 154–177 km/h) Category 3 (111–129 mph, 178–208 km/h) Category 4 (130–156 mph, 209–251 km/h) Category 5 (≥157 mph, ≥252 km/h) Unknown Storm type Tropical cyclone Subtropical cyclone Extratropical cyclone, remnant low, tropical disturbance, or monsoon depression

The remnants of a tropical wave entered the eastern Gulf of Mexico on July 20. An area of low pressure formed and developed into a tropical depression on July 21. Under weak steering currents, the tropical depression drifted southeast, then turned northeast and later east. Based on reports from Hurricane Hunters, the system intensified into Tropical Storm Bob late on July 22. Bob failed to organize significantly as it tracked east through the Gulf, and made landfall between Naples and Fort Myers, Florida, on July 23 as a 45 mph (70 km/h) tropical storm. At the time, most of the convection was concentrated south and east of the center.

While moving across Florida, Bob turned to the northeast, then to the north. It subsequently left the peninsula, entering the Atlantic Ocean near Vero Beach early on July 24. As it moved over the warm waters of the Gulf Stream, it quickly organized and intensified into a Category 1 hurricane while 70 mi (115 km) east of Jacksonville, Florida. Because it was embedded within the western extension of the subtropical ridge, Bob retained higher-than-average atmospheric pressures throughout its lifespan. The hurricane continued north, and made landfall near Beaufort, South Carolina, early on July 25 while maintaining winds of 75 mph (120 km/h). Bob quickly weakened over land, decaying into a tropical storm three hours after landfall. About 12 hours later, it degenerated into a tropical depression near the North Carolina – Virginia border. Bob's remnants turned north-northeast, and were absorbed by a frontal trough over eastern West Virginia on July 26. An associated area of disturbed weather remained separate from the trough, and continued northeast through the Mid-Atlantic and New England.

== Preparations ==
When Bob was designated a tropical storm, the National Hurricane Center issued gale warnings for the Florida Keys west of Craig Key, and from Flamingo to Venice. Gale warnings were later posted for the Atlantic coast of Florida northward through St. Augustine. Small craft south of St. Augustine were advised to remain in port. While the storm was situated off the east-central coast of Florida, the National Hurricane Center issued a gale warning and a hurricane watch from Savannah, Georgia, to Little River, South Carolina. The hurricane watch was upgraded to a hurricane warning after Bob's intensification to Category 1 status.

Thousands of residents evacuated coastal areas of South Carolina, many of whom stayed at inland hotels; 850 people sought protection in shelters, including 500 at an elementary school in Horry County and 240 in a shelter in the Grand Strand. In Beaufort County, city and county offices were closed early and businesses were advised to send their workers home prematurely. Officials in Chatham County, Georgia, evacuated nursing homes on Tybee Island, and encouraged others to leave due to the potential for high tides to isolate the island by cutting off U.S. Route 80.

== Impact ==
Hurricane Bob inflicted $20 million in damages and caused five indirect deaths. Damage from the storm was not severe enough to justify retirement of the name "Bob", and as such it was re-used during the 1991 season.

=== Florida ===
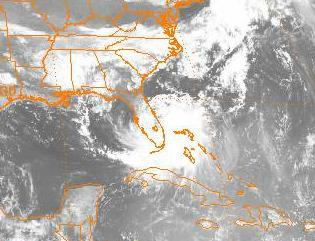
Tropical Storm Bob making landfall on Florida

In southern Florida, the heaviest rainfall remained to the south and east of the storm's center; 21.5 inches (546 mm) of precipitation was recorded in Everglades City. Northern parts of the state reported trace amounts to several inches of precipitation. At Naples, sustained winds reached 40 mph (65 km/h), with a peak gust of 58 mph (93 km/h). Rough surf and above-average tides caused moderate to severe beach erosion in portions of coastal Manatee, Sarasota, and Charlotte counties. Before landfall, Tropical Storm Bob spawned an F0 tornado in Brevard County that caused $2,500 in damage (1985 USD, $4,700 2006 USD) along its 1-mile (1.6 km) path.

Tropical Storm Bob flooded roads and downed trees in Florida. Rough seas broke over sea walls in southwestern parts of the state, and the combination of high tides and heavy rain caused forced the closure of causeways to Sanibel Island and Marco Island, leaving the islands temporarily isolated. They were re-opened when the waters receded, though the causeway to Sanibel Island sustained some damage. Florida Power & Light Co. reported that 1,200 to 1,500 residences were without power on July 23. In Palm Beach County, rainfall from the storm caused agricultural damage.

Overall damage was minimal and primarily confined to minor property near the coast. The storm's rainfall was beneficial in areas that had suffered dry conditions. In northeastern Florida and Georgia, beach erosion occurred along the coast. Bob was one of four July tropical cyclones to affect Palm Beach County since 1878.

=== Carolinas ===
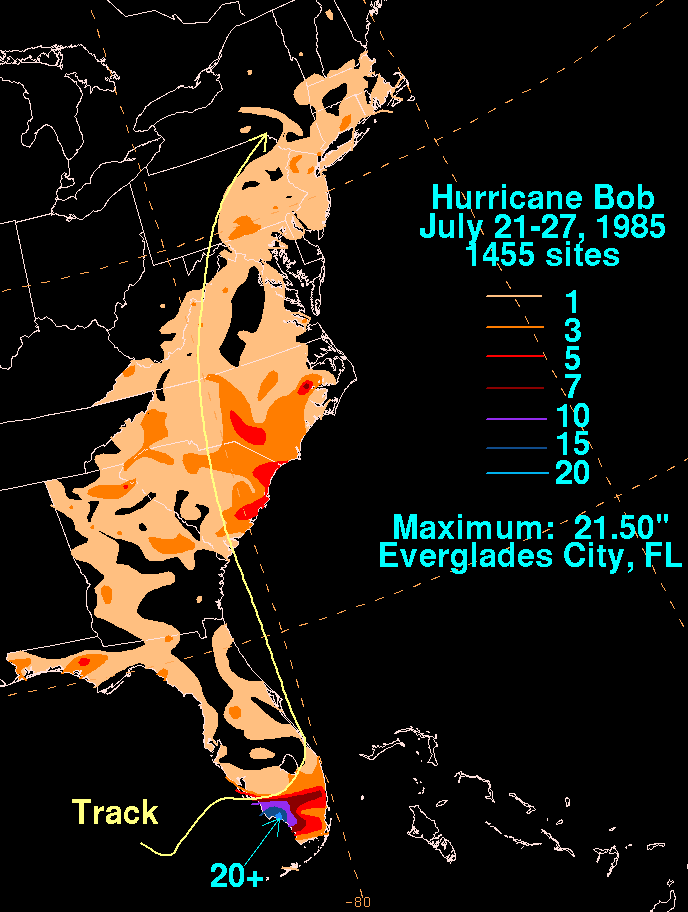
Estimated rainfall totals from Hurricane Bob

The strongest winds from Hurricane Bob were confined to areas east of its center when it came ashore around 1 am Eastern Standard Time (EST). Along the barrier islands off the coast of Charleston, windows were broken and power lines knocked down. Further inland, the lack of damage in spite of high winds was described as "almost unbelievable". Georgetown, South Carolina, 105 miles (170 km) northeast of where the storm made landfall, recorded sustained winds of 58 mph (93 km/h), and a spiral rainband produced a peak wind gust of 83 mph (134 km/h) in Holden Beach. Upon moving ashore, the hurricane produced an estimated storm tide of 2.6 feet (0.79 m) in Edisto Beach. Rainfall in the Carolinas was moderate; portions of coastal South Carolina received over 5 inches (127 mm) of precipitation. Myrtle Beach reported a statewide peak of 7.79 inches (198 mm). Hurricane-force wind gusts downed trees and power lines, leaving over 32,000 people without power, including more than 25,000 in the Charleston area. Near the coast, high winds shattered windows.

Strong waves broke over sea walls in Charleston, spilling floodwaters onto coastal streets and homes. Damage in the state was relatively light, and no serious injuries were reported. However, a gas station in Folly Beach was torn apart by the winds, and some structures along the coast sustained roof damage. In the Charleston Harbor, an empty tanker was forced aground on a sandbar by the winds. Throughout most areas, the storm was insignificant; a police sergeant in Summerville commented, "All we've had were some trees blown over, hardly enough to make it worth staying up so late."

Much of North Carolina received over 1 inch (25.4 mm) of rain; as much as 7 inches (178 mm) fell in Beaufort County. The storm caused one traffic-related fatality in the state.

=== Mid-Atlantic and New England ===
In Virginia, a large band of thunderstorms associated with the hurricane brought strong winds and spawned three tornadoes. A funnel cloud formed in Albemarle County evolved into an F3 tornado after crossing into Greene County. It destroyed two houses and uprooted several trees, inflicting $250,000 in damage (1985 USD, $470,000 2006 USD). F0 tornadoes were also generated in Goochland County and Hanover County; the two tornadoes damaged a total of ten houses. Funnel clouds were sighted throughout the Baltimore-Washington Metropolitan Area.

Heavy precipitation and high winds disrupted the 1985 Boy Scouts of America National Scout Jamboree at Fort A. P. Hill near Fredericksburg, Virginia, knocking over hundreds of tents and fifty portable toilets. One scout was struck by a falling gateway and several others sustained minor cuts and bruises. The storm produced winds of 48 mph (77 km/h) at the Ronald Reagan Washington National Airport, and about 30,000 people near Washington, D.C., and 125,000 in Baltimore were left without power. Moderate winds downed a sea plane near Hains Point in the Washington Channel. Rough seas capsized a few boats along the Potomac River, and rainfall from Bob's remnants forced the cancellation of a Richmond Braves game. and collapsed a house under construction in Great Falls, Maryland. A dam in Northeastern Virginia sustained storm-related damage. Slick roads led to several traffic accidents; one person in Washington, D.C., and three in Maryland were killed. High winds in the Washington, D.C., area also flipped over a pontoon-equipped Cessna 210 airplane near Hains Point, holding a five-man television crew. The crew, who worked for the television series Lime Street had been preparing to film a chase scene for the television drama. All five escaped the plane safely with the aid of the Metropolitan Police Department of the District of Columbia harbor patrol.

Rainfall in the Mid-Atlantic and New England states was around 1 inch (25.4 mm), with isolated reports of over 3 inches (76 mm). About 0.5 inches (13 mm) of precipitation fell in Atlantic City, New Jersey, within a period of 10 minutes. In Maryland, the rainfall helped to relieve persistent dry conditions.

== See also ==
- List of Atlantic hurricanes
- List of United States hurricanes
  - List of Florida hurricanes
  - List of North Carolina hurricanes
  - List of New England hurricanes
  - List of South Carolina hurricanes
