= Hurricane Kate (1985) =

Category 3 Atlantic hurricane

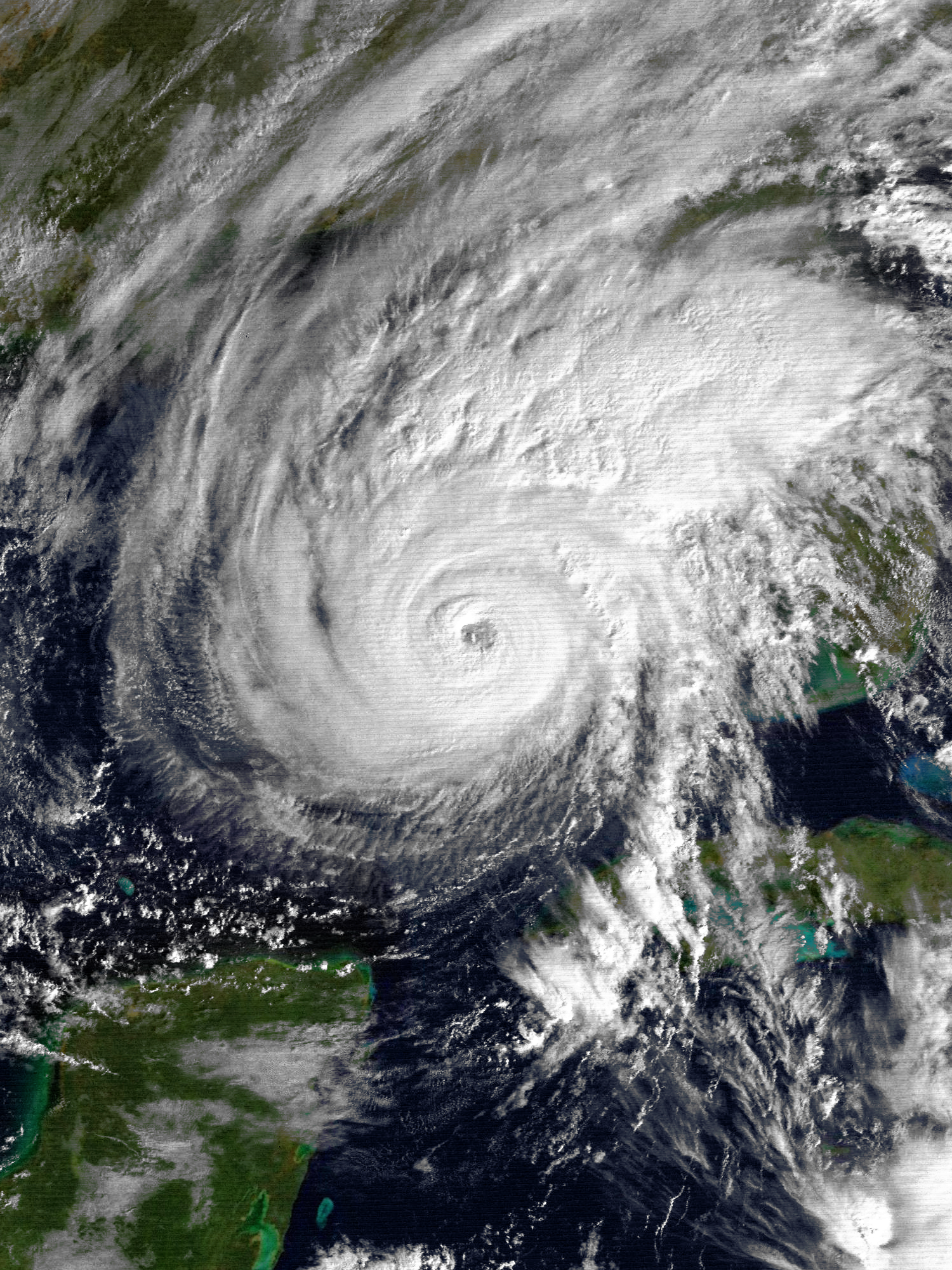
- Hurricane Kate at peak intensity in the Gulf of Mexico on November 20

Meteorological history
- Formed: November 15, 1985
- Dissipated: November 23, 1985

Category 3 major hurricane
- 1-minute sustained (SSHWS/NWS)
- Highest winds: 120 mph (195 km/h)
- Lowest pressure: 953 mbar (hPa); 28.14 inHg

Overall effects
- Fatalities: 15 total
- Damage: $700 million (1985 USD)
- Areas affected: Haiti, The Bahamas, Cuba, Southeastern United States (Florida, Georgia)
- IBTrACS
- Part of the 1985 Atlantic hurricane season

Hurricane Kate was the latest Atlantic hurricane by calendar date to make landfall in the United States. The eleventh named storm, seventh hurricane, and third major hurricane of the 1985 Atlantic hurricane season, (Note: A major hurricane is a storm that ranks as Category 3 or higher on the Saffir-Simpson hurricane wind scale.) it was the final in a series of tropical cyclones to impact the United States during 1985. Kate originated from the interaction of an upper-level trough and tropical wave northeast of Puerto Rico on November 15. Though the system tracked erratically during the first hours of its existence, the intensification of a region of high pressure to the cyclone's north caused Kate to turn westward. A favorable atmospheric pattern allowed the newly developed system to intensify to hurricane intensity on November 16, and further to Category 2 intensity three days later.

Kate made its first landfall on the northern coast of Cuba at this intensity prior to emerging as a slightly weaker storm during the evening hours of November 19. Once clear of land, it began to strengthen quickly, becoming a Category 3 and reaching its peak intensity of 120 mph (195 km/h) the following day. On November 21, a cold front moving across the Mississippi Valley resulted in a north and eventual northeast turn of the cyclone, and on November 22, Kate came ashore near Mexico Beach, Florida, as a minimal Category 2 hurricane with winds of 100 mph (160 km/h). Gradual weakening ensued as the cyclone moved along the Southeast United States coastline, and Kate transitioned to an extratropical cyclone on November 23, a day after exiting the coastline of North Carolina. Kate was the most recent hurricane to make landfall in Florida during the month of November until Hurricane Nicole in 2022.

The threat of Hurricane Kate in Cuba prompted the evacuation of 360,000 people. Heavy rainfall in Cuba caused numerous mudslides and flooding, killing 10 people and leading to severe agriculture damage. Wind gusts over hurricane intensity resulted in widespread power outages, significant building damage, and major crop damage. Damage totaled roughly $400 million, (Note: All damage totals are in 1985 United States dollars.) making it the most damaging hurricane to strike the island in many decades. In preparation for the system's arrival, many hurricane watches and warnings were put into effect. Hundreds of thousands of residents were evacuated, and Florida governor Bob Graham declared a state of emergency for six counties; this was later cancelled following the relatively minor impacts of Kate. In addition, many shelters were opened.

When Kate struck the Florida Panhandle, it became the first hurricane to make landfall in that location since Hurricane Eloise in 1975. Storm surge and flooding rains destroyed much of the oyster industry, causing many people to lose their jobs in the weeks after the storm. Gusts over 100 mph (160 km/h) contributed to downed trees and building damage, while the combination of wind and rain led to downed power poles. Across the remainder of the southeast United States, several inches of rainfall led to flash flooding, damage to roadways, and major tree damage. Overall, Kate resulted in 15 fatalities and $700 million in damage.

== Meteorological history ==
Map plotting the storm's track and intensity, according to the Saffir–Simpson scale Map key Saffir–Simpson scale Tropical depression (≤38 mph, ≤62 km/h) Tropical storm (39–73 mph, 63–118 km/h) Category 1 (74–95 mph, 119–153 km/h) Category 2 (96–110 mph, 154–177 km/h) Category 3 (111–129 mph, 178–208 km/h) Category 4 (130–156 mph, 209–251 km/h) Category 5 (≥157 mph, ≥252 km/h) Unknown Storm type Tropical cyclone Subtropical cyclone Extratropical cyclone, remnant low, tropical disturbance, or monsoon depression

Before the formation of Hurricane Kate, a ridge was located across the southeastern United States for much of the autumn of 1985; concurrently, a major trough persisted across the western portion of the country. As a result, weather conditions across the Gulf of Mexico and western Atlantic Ocean in November were more typical of a pattern in late September, including sea surface temperatures of 81 °F (27 °C). On November 13, a weak tropical wave (Note: A tropical wave is an inverted trough of low pressure that moves along the trade winds.) began interacting with a trough to the northeast of the Lesser Antilles. It gradually organized due to the favorable conditions, and on November 15, a Hurricane Hunters flight into the area indicated the development of a tropical cyclone. As gale-force winds were already present, the system was immediately declared Tropical Storm Kate, about 240 miles (385 km) northeast of San Juan, Puerto Rico.

With a ridge to its north, Kate tracked westward after developing, and an upper-level low developed to the southwest of the storm. The combination of the two provided favorable outflow, allowing Kate to quickly intensify. On November 16, the storm attained hurricane status while moving through the southeastern Bahamas. After continued strengthening, Kate made landfall at 0600 UTC on November 19 over north-central Cuba with a well-defined eye. When it moved ashore, Kate had a pressure of 967 mbar (28.6 inHg) and winds of about 110 mph (180 km/h). The hurricane maintained its well-defined eye while moving across northern Cuba, and about 12 hours after making landfall, it emerged into the southeastern Gulf of Mexico just east of Havana. Over the next 24 hours, Kate re-intensified off the southwest coast of Florida as it passed about 85 mi (135 km) southwest of Key West. On November 20, the Hurricane Hunters observed winds as strong as 125 mph (200 km/h), and a buoy recorded a gust of 136 mph (219 km/h); this was the highest recorded wind gust from a buoy in the Gulf of Mexico until Hurricane Lili in 2002. Based on these observations, it was estimated that Kate attained peak winds of about 120 mph (190 km/h) around 1200 UTC on November 20.

Hurricane Kate maintained peak intensity for about 18 hours. On November 21, a cold front moving through the Mississippi Valley deflected the hurricane to the north and northeast. The combination of cooler waters and wind shear from the front weakened Kate to an intensity of 100 mph (160 km/h) by the time the hurricane struck Crooked Island near Mexico Beach, Florida late on November 21. After landfall, Kate continued to the northeast, crossing into Georgia and weakened into a tropical storm. Kate emerged from North Carolina into the Atlantic Ocean late on November 22. Encountering even colder waters and continued shear, the storm weakened further while turning to the east-southeast. On November 23, Kate transitioned into an extratropical cyclone to the west of Bermuda, terminating at 1800 UTC that day.

Until 2011, Kate's was considered the second-latest hurricane landfall in the United States, behind only a cyclone in 1925 that struck on December 1; however, a systematic reanalysis indicated that the 1925 system was only a tropical storm. In turn, Kate took the record. With Kate's landfall, the 1985 season had six hurricanes that struck the United States, only one short of the record seven in 1886.

== Preparations ==
By November 18, a hurricane warning was in effect for the southeast and central Bahamas and the Turks and Caicos Islands. Flood warnings were issued for northern Puerto Rico and the Dominican Republic. In preparation for the hurricane's arrival, officials forced 360,000 people to evacuate in north-central Cuba.

While Kate was moving through the Bahamas, the National Hurricane Center (NHC) issued a hurricane warning from Jupiter to Fort Myers, Florida, including the Florida Keys. Then-Governor of Florida Bob Graham declared a state of emergency for six counties in South Florida. However, it was reversed following the relatively minor effects in the area. Officials recommended evacuation of the Florida Keys, leading to heavy traffic on the Overseas Highway and prompting the Red Cross to open 12 shelters. Three shelters were opened in Key West, but only 500 individuals utilized them during the storm. Most residents chose to endure the storm in their homes. In Fort Lauderdale, schools were closed, and residents of mobile homes were required to leave.

Shortly after the storm reached its peak intensity on November 20, the NHC issued a hurricane watch from Grand Isle, Louisiana, to Cedar Key, Florida. Later that day, a portion of the watch area was upgraded to a warning from Bay St. Louis, Mississippi to St. Marks, Florida. About 20,000 employees on oil platforms in the Gulf of Mexico were evacuated, many by helicopter. The USS Lexington left port from Naval Air Station Pensacola to ride out the storm in open waters, and aircraft in the region were flown inland. About 100,000 people along the Florida Panhandle were told to leave their houses after Governor Bob Graham issued evacuation orders in 13 counties. About 2,000 people stayed in 34 shelters in Panama City. Roads in the region suffered traffic jams from the large volume of evacuees. Portions of the Florida Gulf Coast had been threatened by Hurricane Elena earlier in the season, and some evacuees of that storm intended not to leave during Kate due to the poor shelter conditions that they had experienced. Governor Graham activated 300 members of the Florida National Guard to prevent looting and to assist in evacuations. One person died from a stress-induced heart attack in Chipley after evacuating. Outside of Florida, about 2,200 people fled Grand Isle, Louisiana.

After Kate moved ashore, the NHC issued gale warnings along the East Coast of the United States from St. Augustine, Florida to Chincoteague, Virginia.

== Impact ==
=== Caribbean and Turks and Caicos Islands ===
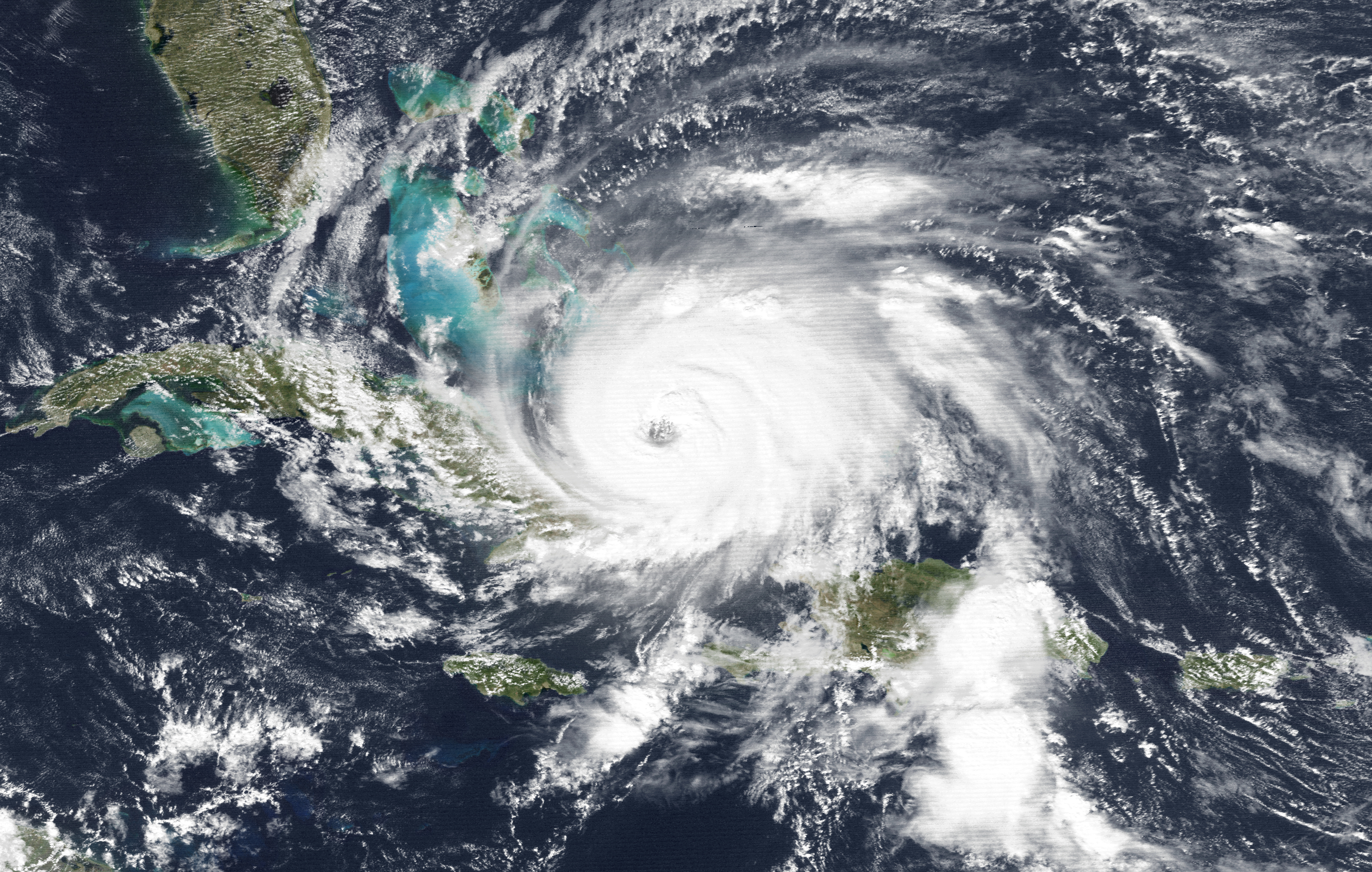
Kate approaching Cuba on November 18

Early in its duration, Hurricane Kate sank one boat near Puerto Rico and disabled three others. The crew of five on the sunken boat were rescued after 17 hours. Several homes in northern Puerto Rico were damaged, forcing hundreds to evacuate. Flooding was also reported in the Dominican Republic, including around the capital Santo Domingo.

Heavy rainfall and winds up to 60 mph (97 km/h) were reported in the Turks and Caicos Islands. In Jamaica, heavy precipitation caused mudslides, which in turn blocked 23 major and minor roads and destroyed many bridges, culverts, and drains. Flooding in general caused severe damage to agriculture, especially in Clarendon, Manchester, Saint Ann, Saint Elizabeth, and Trelawny Parishes. Seven fatalities were reported, while the cost to repair damage was approximately $3 million (1985 USD).

As Kate moved across northern Cuba, it produced strong winds that peaked at 75 mph (120 km/h) in Sagua La Grande. Wind gusts peaked at 104 mph (167 km/h) in Varadero, and winds in the capital of Havana reached 70 mph (110 km/h). In Havana, high winds caused power outages and destroyed buildings. Waves of 9 feet (2.7 m) affected the city's waterfront. Outside of Havana, the hurricane damaged sugar mills and much of the sugar cane crop; throughout the island, the winds destroyed 3,653 miles^{2} (9461 km^{2}) of sugar cane and 34,000 tonnes (37,000 tons) of sugar. The storm also destroyed 141,000 tonnes (139,000 long tons; 155,000 short tons) of bananas and 87,078 tonnes (85,703 long tons; 95,987 short tons) of other fruits and vegetables. Across the island, Kate damaged 88,207 houses and destroyed 4,382 others, affecting 476,891 people. Many public buildings, including schools, were damaged. Throughout the country, Kate killed 10 people and injured about 50 people. Damage was estimated at $400 million, which was the highest total from all landfalling hurricanes from 1903 to 1998, unadjusted for inflation.

=== Florida ===
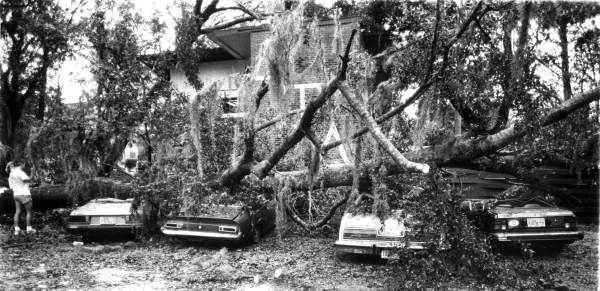
Damage after Hurricane Kate in Tallahassee

As Kate passed to the southwest of Key West, the storm produced winds of 47 mph (76 km/h) there, with unofficial wind gusts of 104 mph (167 km/h). Rainfall totals in southwest Florida were generally around 1 in (25 mm), although Key West reported 2.08 in (53 mm) of precipitation. High winds downed trees and power lines, leaving areas between Key West and Big Pine Key without power. Electrical outages contributed to a mobile home being destroyed by fire, and one person died through electrocution. Above-normal tides caused minor flooding and erosion along the Florida Keys. Two people died after their boat capsized in the lower Keys.

Kate was the first hurricane to make landfall in the Florida Panhandle since Hurricane Eloise in 1975. In the region, the hurricane dropped heavy rainfall along its path, peaking at 8.32 in (211 mm) in Panama City. While moving ashore, Kate produced an 11 feet (3.4 m) storm surge at Cape San Blas, causing beach and dune erosion in Gulf County. Storm surge flooding left 150 houses uninhabitable in Wakulla County. The hurricane damaged a bridge to St. George Island that had been rebuilt after Hurricane Elena, and large portions of U.S. Routes 90 and 98 were washed out or damaged. Just two months after Elena ravaged the Apalachicola Bay shellfish harvesting industry, Hurricane Kate destroyed remaining oyster beds, leaving many oystermen in the area without jobs.

Strong winds buffeted the Florida Panhandle, accompanied by one tornado and several funnel clouds. In Panama City, wind gusts reached 78 mph (126 km/h), damaging two houses, a motel, and a fishing pier. The winds were strong enough to remove the roof of a two-story federal building. Sustained winds blew 74 mph (119 km/h) at Cape San Blas, with gusts up to 108 mph (174 km/h). Across the area, Kate severely damaged 242 buildings, mostly in Franklin County, where the storm ranked as the most devastating of the late 20th century. The storm compromised about 5.4 mi (8.7 km) of roads in the county, and throughout the region many roads were washed out. The intense winds brought down numerous trees, some of them onto adjacent structures. One fallen tree struck a car, killing one person and injuring another. The winds also downed power poles and lines. About 90 percent of Florida's capital Tallahassee, or about 80,000 people, lost power, and along the coast from Panama City to Apalachicola, the storm left about 30,000 homes and businesses without electricity. Overall, the hurricane destroyed 325 homes along the panhandle, and about 500 buildings were severely damaged.

=== Elsewhere ===
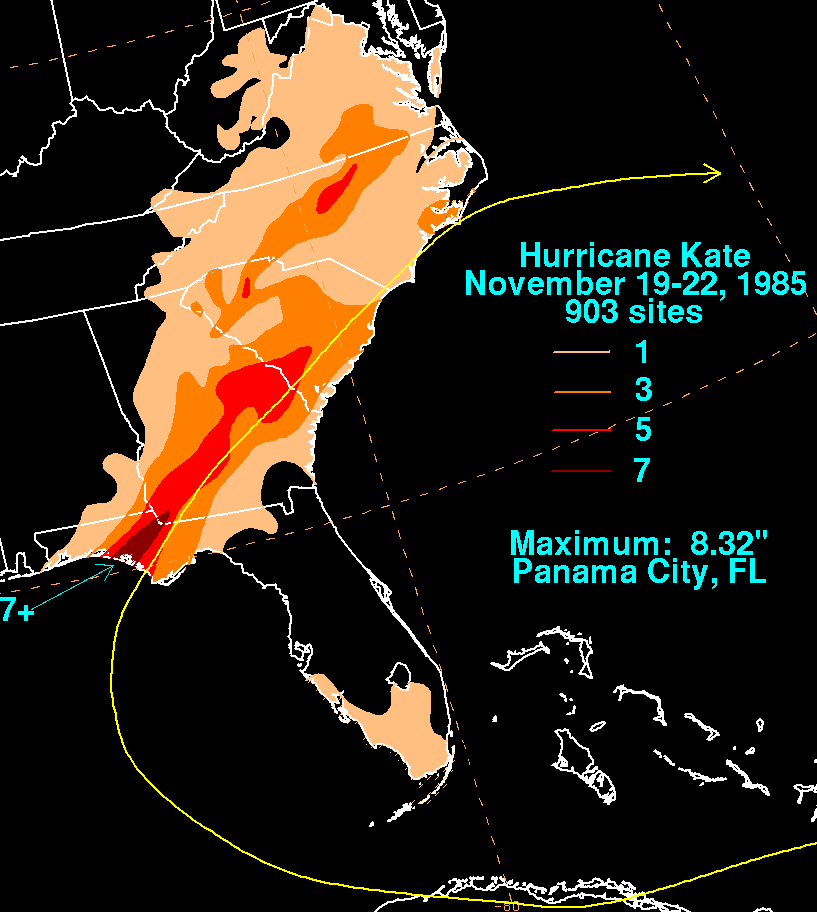
Rainfall map of Kate in the United States

Light rainfall of around 1 in (25 mm) from the hurricane extended into southeastern Alabama. Rainfall was much heavier in Georgia, peaking at 7.73 in (196 mm) in Bainbridge. Portions of southwestern Georgia experienced heavy damage from flash flooding and winds, and several secondary roads were washed out. Gusts of 80 mph (130 km/h) downed thousands of trees, and one fallen tree killed a man west of Thomasville. The cotton, soybean, and pecan crops suffered heavy losses, estimated at $50 million. Property and utility damage was also assessed at $50 million, and damage from flash flooding was estimated at $1 million. There were scattered power outages in southern Georgia, affecting fewer than 3,000 customers by Georgia Power Company's estimation. While moving across southeastern Georgia, Kate produced a 62 mph (100 km/h) wind gust in Savannah. The city also reported 1.73 in (44 mm) of rainfall.

Farther northeast, Charleston, South Carolina reported a wind gust of 50 mph (80 km/h). The highest rainfall total in the state was 6.56 in (167 mm) in Hampton. The rains caused flash flooding that washed out secondary roads and a bridge. The storm knocked tree limbs onto power lines, leaving about 48,000 people without power. In Beaufort, trees fell onto four cars and a mobile home, and high waves sank a boat. In Wilmington, North Carolina, the storm dropped 1.99 in (51 mm) of precipitation. Rains across the state caused generally minor flooding, although several cars were swept off roadways. Rising floodwaters prompted the evacuation of a nursing home in Kannapolis. Rainfall extended northward into Virginia. Damage throughout the United States was estimated at $300 million.

As an extratropical cyclone, Kate moved north of Bermuda and produced wind gusts of 26 mph (42 km/h) on the island.

== Aftermath ==
In the month after Hurricane Kate struck the island, the government of Cuba issued a request to the United Nations (UN) World Food Council for international assistance. In response, various UN member nations collectively provided $60,000 for pesticides; $250,000 for herbicides, fungicides, and potato seeds; and $1.381 million in cooking oils and beans to fulfill the dietary needs of over 475,000 people for 60 days. The Soviet Union also donated about $15 million worth of rice and wheat flour.

Hurricane Kate delayed a runoff mayoral election in Key West by two weeks. Shortly after the storm, the police departments of both Leon and Jackson Counties ordered a nightly curfew. Two disaster relief centers were opened in Franklin County, one in Apalachicola and the other in Eastpoint. On December 3, 1985, President of the United States Ronald Reagan declared seven Florida counties as disaster areas, making them eligible to receive federal aid.

Due to the widespread power outages along the Florida Panhandle, electrical companies enlisted extra workers to repair downed lines. Officials had put a curfew in place for Tallahassee due to power outages created by the hurricane, and the curfew was lifted on November 24 after power was gradually restored and roads were cleared of debris. Police officers in the city arrested 20 people for violating curfew or creating unrest.

Some sections of coastline already suffering from severe erosion lost additional swaths of beach to a 10-foot (3 m) storm surge and strong waves. Many fishermen before and after the storm encountered diminished fish catches after the hurricane.

== See also ==
- List of North Carolina hurricanes (1980–1999)
- List of Florida hurricanes (1975–1999)
- Other storms of the same name
- Hurricane Michael (2018) – Category 5 hurricane that devastated the Florida Panhandle
- Hurricane Nicole (2022) – another November hurricane that impacted Florida
- Hurricane Rafael (2024) – tied Kate as the strongest hurricane in the Gulf of Mexico in November
