= 1985 Atlantic hurricane season =

- Season summary map

Seasonal boundaries
- First system formed: July 15, 1985
- Last system dissipated: December 9, 1985

Strongest storm
- Name: Gloria
  - Maximum winds: 145 mph (230 km/h) (1-minute sustained)
  - Lowest pressure: 920 mbar (hPa; 27.17 inHg)

Seasonal statistics
- Total depressions: 14
- Total storms: 11
- Hurricanes: 7
- Major hurricanes (Cat. 3+): 3
- Total fatalities: 60 total
- Total damage: $4.52 billion (1985 USD)

Related articles
- Timeline of the 1985 Atlantic hurricane season; 1985 Pacific hurricane season; 1985 Pacific typhoon season; 1985 North Indian Ocean cyclone season

The 1985 Atlantic hurricane season was an average yet destructive hurricane season. It featured a near-record number of hurricanes landfalls in the United States – six – tied with 2020 and only surpassed by 1886. The season officially began on June 1 and lasted until November 30. This was partially attributed to a La Niña – a meteorological phenomenon that produces favorable conditions across the Atlantic basin, such as lower wind shear and higher sea surface temperatures. The first storm, Ana, developed on July 15 near Bermuda and caused minor effects in Canada while transitioning into an extratropical cyclone. Three other tropical cyclones – Claudette, Henri, and Isabel – did not significantly affect land. Claudette developed offshore of the Southeastern United States and brushed Bermuda and the Azores. Henri and Isabel were dissipating as they approached land. However, the precursor of the latter caused a severe flood in Puerto Rico that killed 180 people. Additionally, Tropical Storm Fabian and three tropical depressions did not have any known impact on land.

Although several storms caused minimal effects, several tropical cyclones also left extensive impact. Hurricane Gloria, the strongest storm of the season, resulted in 14 fatalities and about $900 million (1985 USD) in damage in North Carolina, Virginia, the Mid-Atlantic, and New England. Hurricane Elena threatened the central Gulf Coast of the United States, then abruptly re-curved toward Florida. Unexpectedly, Elena doubled-back and struck Mississippi, resulting in two mass evacuations. The storm caused $1.3 billion in losses, with most of the damage in Louisiana and Mississippi. Similarly, Hurricane Juan caused $1.5 billion in damage due to its erratic track offshore and across Louisiana. Three other tropical cyclones – Hurricanes Bob, Danny, and Kate – caused moderate to extensive damage in Cuba and the United States. Kate was a unusually late and record breaking November hurricane that struck the Florida on the 21st; a record for the latest U.S. hurricane. Overall, the tropical cyclones of this season collectively caused over $4.52 billion in damage and 60 deaths.

== Seasonal forecasts ==
Predictions of tropical activity in the 1985 season
Source	Date	Named storms	Hurricanes	Major hurricanes	Ref
Record high activity		30	15	7†
Record low activity		1	0†	0†
WRC	Early 1985	10	5	N/A
CSU	April 1985	11	8	N/A
CSU	June 1985	11	8	N/A
CSU	August 1985	10	7	N/A
Actual activity		11	7	3

Forecasts of hurricane activity are issued before each hurricane season by Dr. William M. Gray and his associates at Colorado State University (CSU) and the Weather Research Center (WRC). A normal season as defined by the National Oceanic and Atmospheric Administration (NOAA) has 12.1 named storms, of which 6.4 reach hurricane strength, and 2.7 become major hurricanes. Neither CSU nor WRC issued a forecast on the number of major hurricanes, which are Category 3 or higher on the Saffir–Simpson hurricane wind scale. In early 1985, WRC predicted 8 named storms and 5 hurricanes. The CSU forecast for April 1985 was 11 named storms and 8 hurricanes. This forecast was not revised in June. In their August outlook, CSU predicted 10 named storms and 7 hurricanes.

== Season summary ==
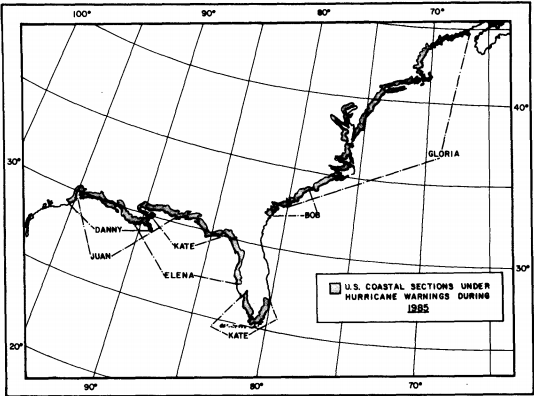
Hurricane warnings issued along the Gulf Coast and East Coast of the United States in 1985

The Atlantic hurricane season officially began on June 1, but activity in 1985 began more than a month and a half later with the formation of Tropical Storm Ana on July 15. It was an average season in which 13 tropical depressions formed. Eleven of the depressions attained tropical storm status and seven of these attained hurricane status. In addition, three tropical cyclone eventually attained major hurricane status, which is slightly above the 1981–2010 average of 2.7 per season. The amount of activity is attributed to a La Niña that persisted since the previous season. Seven hurricanes and two tropical storms made landfall during the season, causing 60 deaths and $4.52 billion in damage. The last storm of the season, Tropical Depression Thirteen, dissipated on December 9, over a week after the official end of the season on November 30.

Tropical cyclogenesis in the 1985 Atlantic hurricane season began with the development Tropical Storm Ana on July 15. Less than a week later, Hurricane Bob developed in the Gulf of Mexico. Activity briefly halted until Hurricane Claudette formed offshore Georgia on August 9. The month of August also featured Hurricanes Danny and Elena. As September is the climatological peak of hurricane season, it was the most active month. Five tropical cyclones developed, including two tropical depressions, Tropical Storms Fabian and Henri, and Hurricane Gloria. Thereafter, activity began to slow, with Tropical Storm Isabel and Hurricane Juan in October. Another named storm, Hurricane Kate, developed near Puerto Rico on November 15. The final tropical cyclone of the season, Tropical Depression Thirteen, developed in the Caribbean Sea on December 7 and dissipated by late on December 9.

The season's activity was reflected with a cumulative accumulated cyclone energy (ACE) rating of 88, which is classified as "near normal". ACE is, broadly speaking, a measure of the power of the hurricane multiplied by the length of time it existed, so storms that last a long time, as well as particularly strong hurricanes, have high ACEs. ACE is only calculated for full advisories on tropical systems at or exceeding 34 knots (39 mph; 63 km/h) or tropical storm strength. Subtropical cyclones are excluded from the total.

== Systems ==
=== Tropical Storm Ana ===
- Tropical storm (SSHWS)
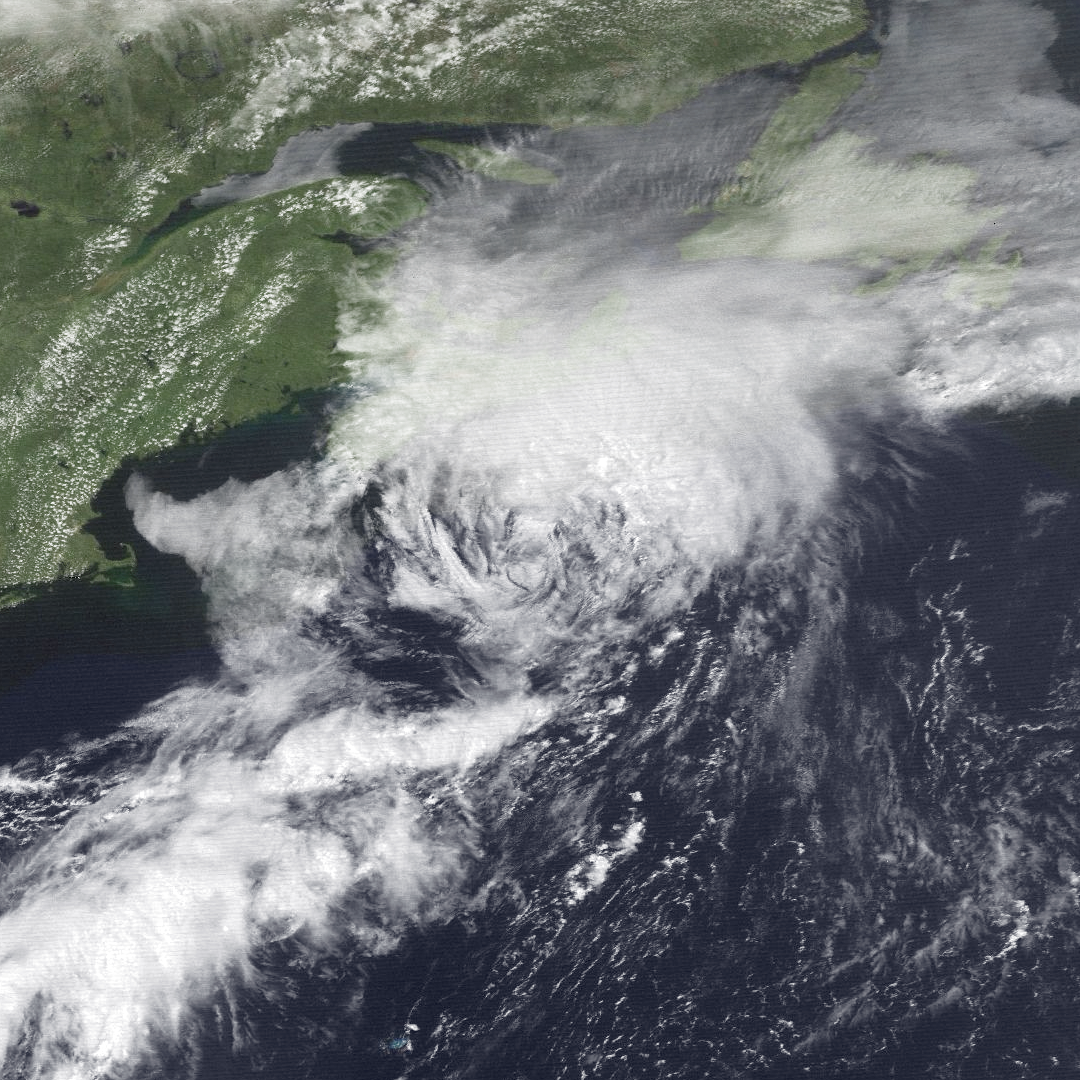
- Duration: July 15 – July 19
- Peak intensity: 70 mph (110 km/h) (1-min); 996 mbar (hPa)

In the second week of July, an area of convection merged with a cut-off low-pressure area, which developed on July 8. After about 7 days, ship data indicated that a circulation developed on July 15. Thus, the system became Tropical Depression One at 1800 UTC that same day, while located south-southeast of Bermuda. The depression slowly curved northwestward around Bermuda and began strengthening. By late on July 16, the depression strengthened into Tropical Storm Ana. Thereafter, the storm turned northward and passed west of Bermuda later that day. On July 17, Ana accelerate north-northeastward under the influence of a frontal system and eventually paralleled Nova Scotia.

While passing close to Sable Island on July 19, Ana peaked with winds of 70 mph (115 km/h). Shortly thereafter, the storm merged with frontal system, hours before it crossed the Burin Peninsula of Newfoundland. The storm produced relatively light winds on Bermuda, with sustained winds of 29 mph (47 km/h) and gusts up to 47 mph (76 km/h), causing no damage. Ana and its remnants dropped light rainfall and produced moderate winds on Sable Island and Nova Scotia. On Sable Island, rainfall peaked at 3.3 inches (84 mm), while 2 inches (51 mm) or less was reported on eastern Nova Scotia. After becoming extratropical, the system dropped slightly heavier precipitation amounts over southeastern Newfoundland, which peaked at 4.2 inches (110 mm).

=== Hurricane Bob ===
- Category 1 hurricane (SSHWS)
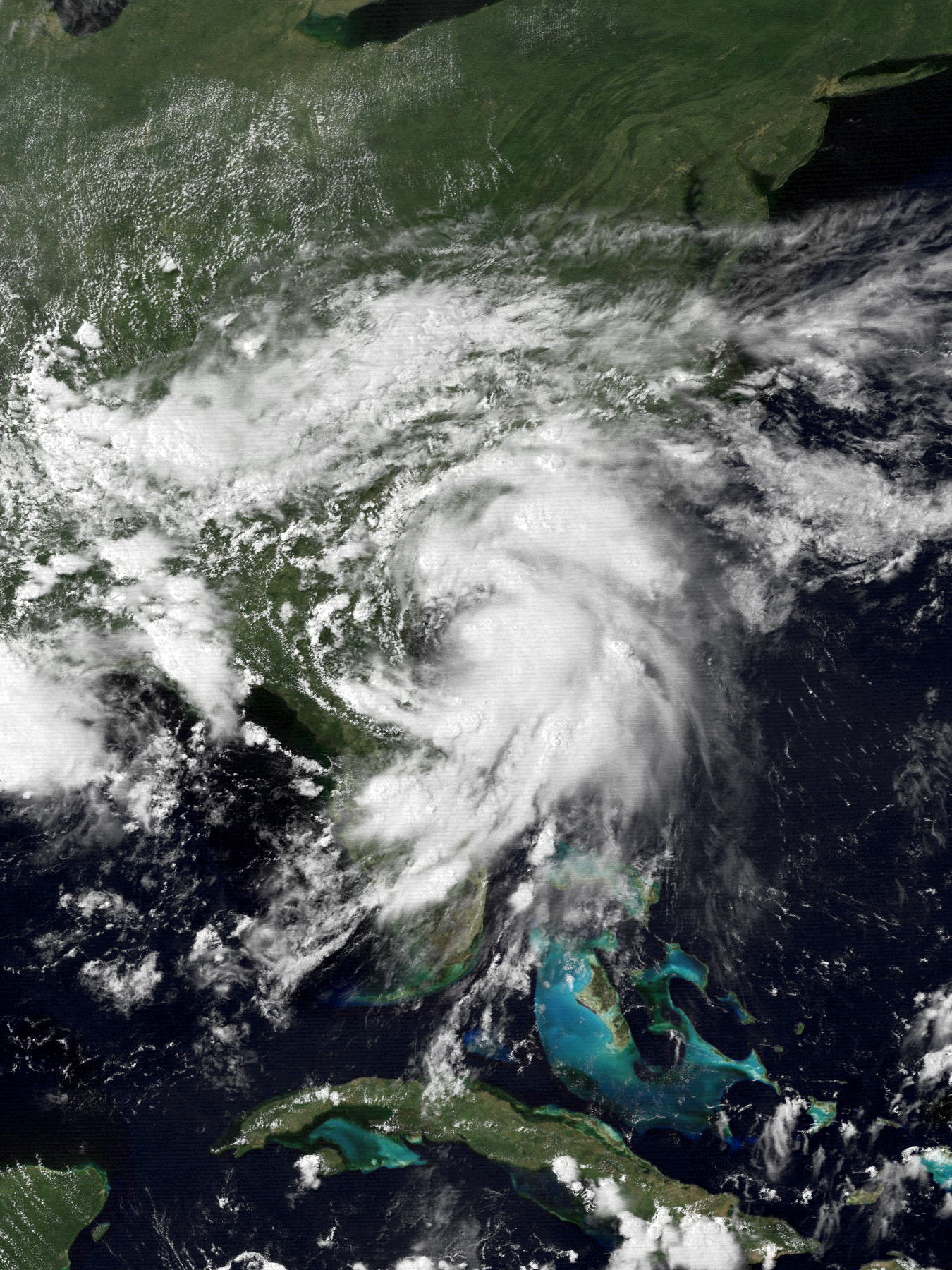
- Duration: July 21 – July 26
- Peak intensity: 75 mph (120 km/h) (1-min); 1002 mbar (hPa)

A tropical wave developed into Tropical Depression Two in the eastern Gulf of Mexico on July 21. The depression drifted southeastward and then northeastward without significant intensification. However, late on July 22, it was upgraded to Tropical Storm Bob. The cyclone made landfall near Fort Myers, Florida with winds of 45 mph (70 km/h) on the following day. While crossing Florida, Bob curved sharply northward and emerged into the Atlantic Ocean near Vero Beach early on July 24. It continued to strengthen and reached hurricane intensity later that day and peaked with winds of 75 mph (120 km/h). At 0300 UTC on July 25, Bob made landfall near Beaufort, South Carolina at the same intensity. The storm weakened quickly inland and was absorbed by a frontal trough over West Virginia on July 26.

Bob dropped heavy rainfall in South Florida, peaking at 21.5 in (550 mm) in Everglades City. Localized flooding occurred, but was mostly limited to inundated streets and minor damage to crops. Hurricane-force winds were observed in South Carolina. Falling trees and power lines left 32,000 residents without electricity, most of which were in the Charleston area. One person was killed in North Carolina from a traffic accident. The storm produced three tornadoes in Virginia, one of which destroyed two homes and another damaged ten homes. Gusty winds and heavy rainfall also knocked over gateways, tents, and portable toilets at the 1985 Boy Scouts of America National Scout Jamboree at Fort A. P. Hill, injuring several scouts. Four people died in Washington, D.C. and Maryland from traffic accidents caused by slick roads. Overall, Bob caused about $20 million in damage and 5 fatalities.

=== Hurricane Claudette ===
- Category 1 hurricane (SSHWS)
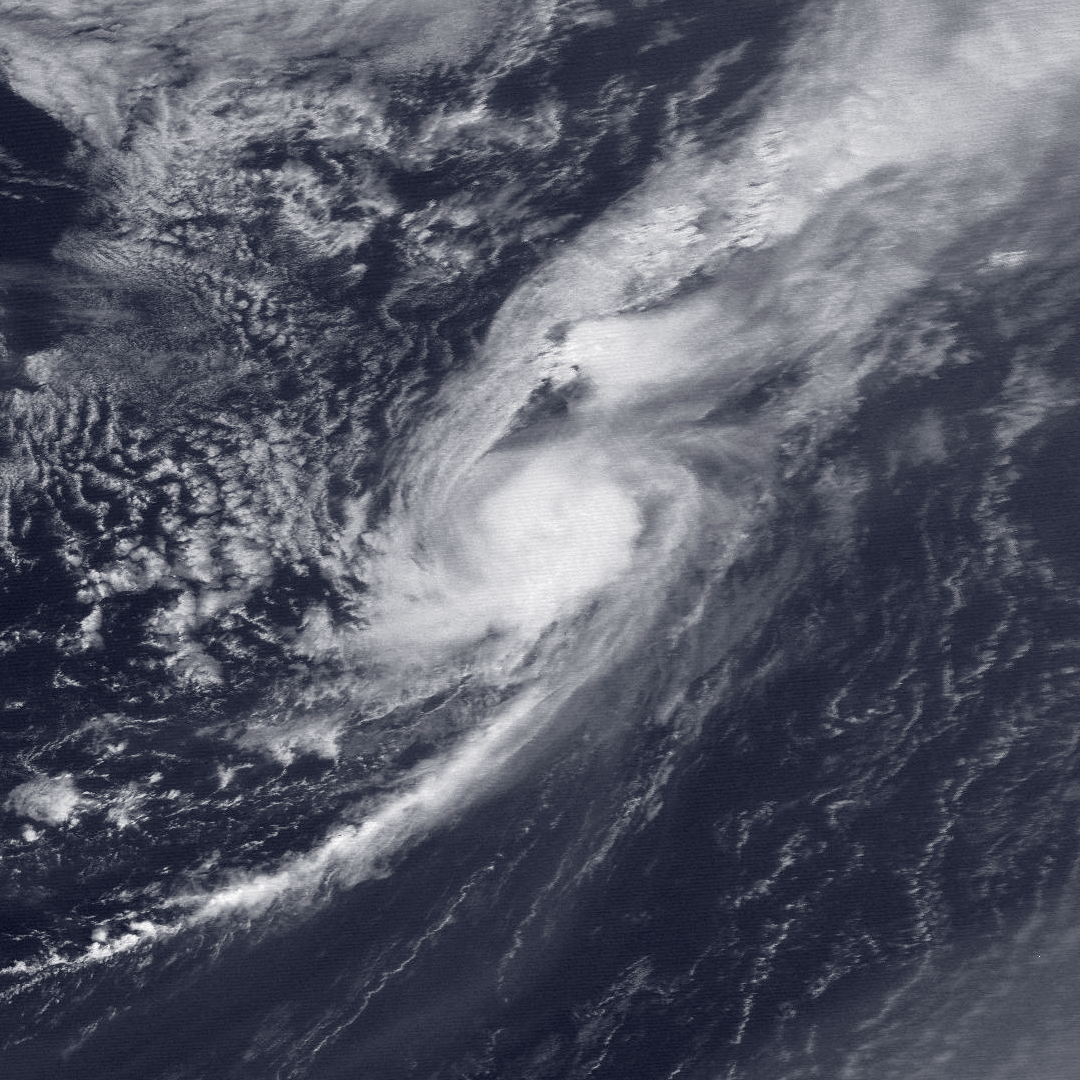
- Duration: August 9 – August 16
- Peak intensity: 85 mph (140 km/h) (1-min); 980 mbar (hPa)

A trough and an associated low-level circulation were observed over the Gulf Coast of the United States on August 7. The system moved eastward and entered the Atlantic Ocean, where it transitioned into a low-pressure area offshore Georgia on August 9. Around that time, the system developed into a subtropical depression. It strengthened and slowly acquired tropical characteristics while moving east-northeastward. Early on August 11, the depression was reclassified as Tropical Storm Claudette. As the storm passed north of Bermuda late on August 12, minor effects were reported, with sustained winds reaching 28 mph (45 km/h) and rainfall up to 0.61 in (15 mm). Continuing eastward, Claudette attained hurricane status early on August 14.

At 1200 UTC on August 15, Claudette peaked with winds of 85 mph (135 km/h) and a minimum barometric pressure of 980 mbar (29 inHg). However, colder sea surface temperatures caused Claudette to weaken to a tropical storm early on August 16. The storm turned northeast and struck Corvo Island in the Azores later that day. At Lajes das Flores on Flores Island, sustained winds reached 29 mph (47 km/h), with gusts up to 52 mph (84 km/h). Furthermore, higher elevations on the island of Flores reported winds as strong as 76 mph (122 km/h). At 0000 UTC on August 17, the storm transitioned into an extratropical cyclone, while located north-northeast of the Azores.

=== Hurricane Danny ===
- Category 1 hurricane (SSHWS)
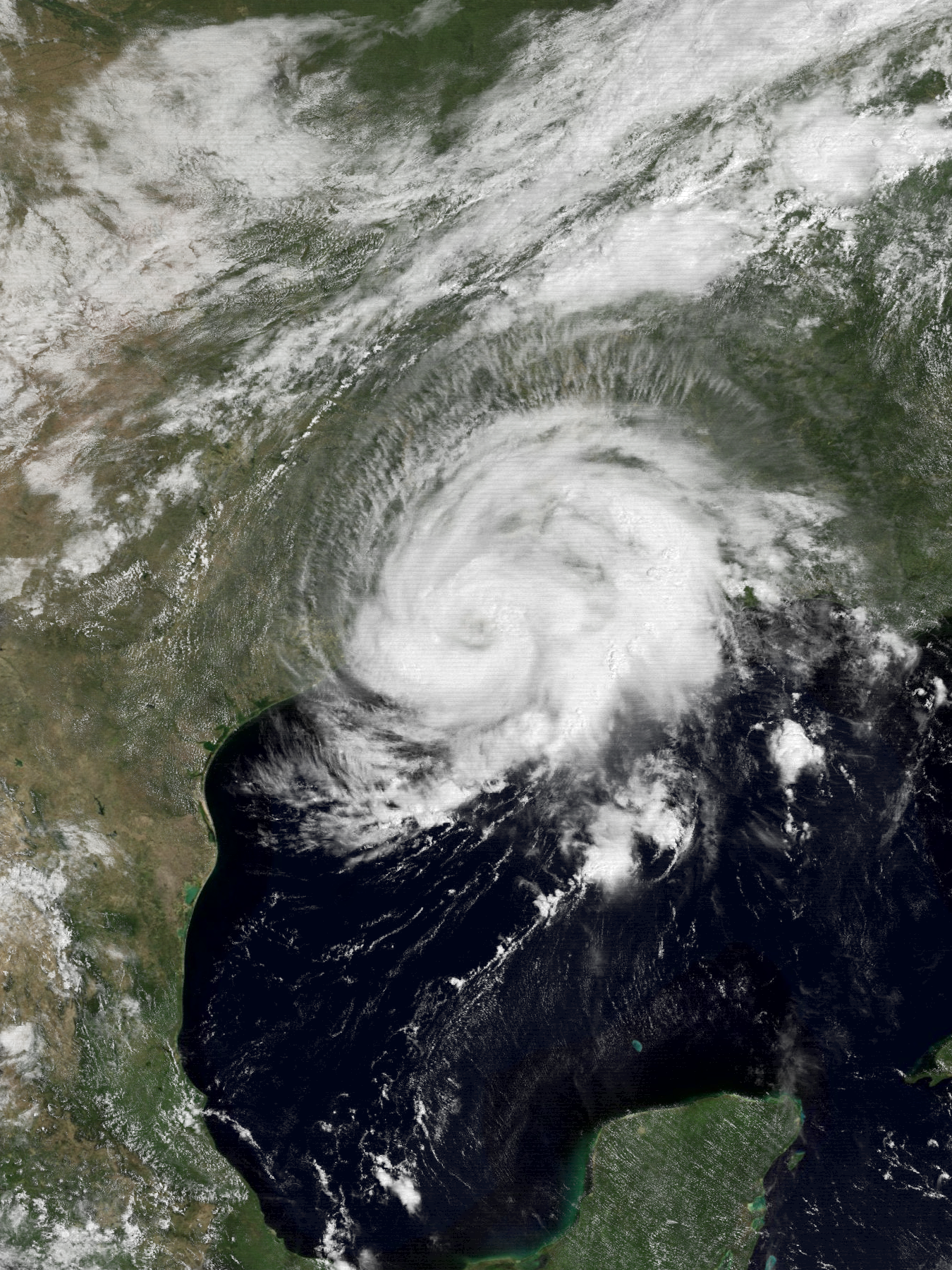
- Duration: August 12 – August 18
- Peak intensity: 90 mph (150 km/h) (1-min); 988 mbar (hPa)

A tropical wave developed into Tropical Depression Four on August 12, while located near Grand Cayman. The depression moved northwestward and initially remained weak. Early on August 13, it brushed Cape San Antonio, Cuba before emerging the Gulf of Mexico later that day. The system then intensified into Tropical Storm Danny on August 14. Danny deepened further and became a hurricane early on the following day, while beginning to re-curve north-northwestward. At 1620 UTC on August 16, Danny attained its peak intensity with winds of 90 mph (145 km/h) and a minimum barometric pressure of 988 mbar (29.2 inHg). Only 10 minutes later, the storm made landfall near Grand Chenier, Louisiana at the same intensity. Early on August 17, Danny weakened to a tropical storm and was downgraded to a tropical depression several hours later. It moved east-northeastward across the Southeastern United States, until dissipating over southeastern Virginia on August 18.

There was widespread coastal and inland flooding in Louisiana. The storm brought up to 8.91 inches (226 mm) of precipitation to Kentwood. Additionally, there were two tornadoes reported in the state. Overall, 33 single-family homes and 26 mobile homes were destroyed, while 3 condos, 908 single-family houses and 265 mobile homes were damaged. A combination of rainfall and storm surge in southern Mississippi caused severe beach erosion and flooded 70 homes in Hancock County alone. Further north, a tornado in Enterprise severely damaged 6 homes, 3 barns, and 2 roofs; it also destroyed 1 house. In Alabama, the storm spawned 34 tornadoes, which destroyed 27 single-family residences and 18 mobile homes. About 90 homes, 8 mobile homes, and 23 businesses suffered damage. Impact was similar but less severe in several other states, including Georgia, Maryland, South Carolina, Virginia, and Texas. Danny caused 5 fatalities and about $100 million in damage.

=== Hurricane Elena ===
- Category 3 hurricane (SSHWS)
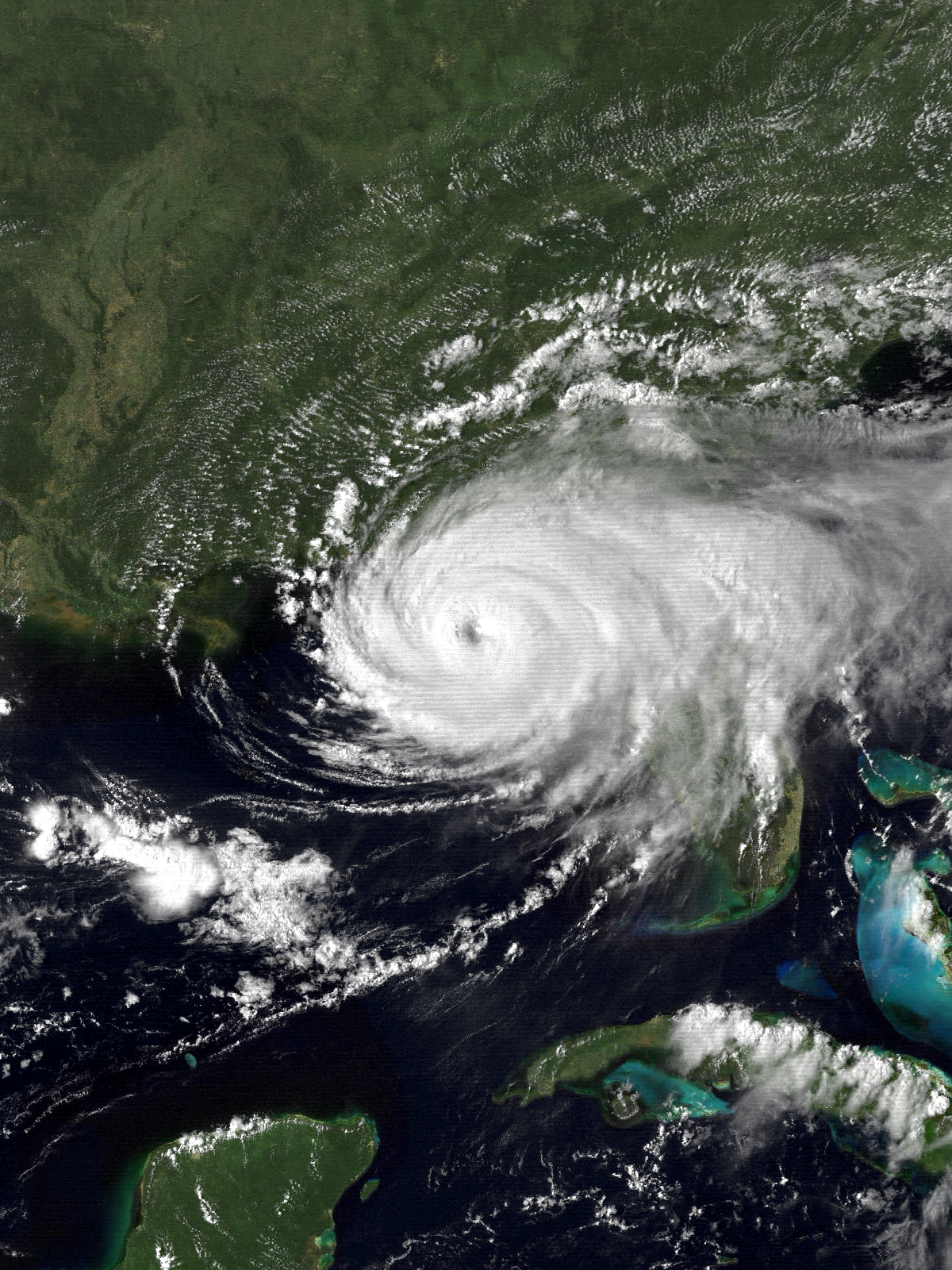
- Duration: August 28 – September 4
- Peak intensity: 125 mph (205 km/h) (1-min); 953 mbar (hPa)

A tropical wave developed into Tropical Depression Five on August 28, while located near the eastern tip of Cuba. The depression then moved ashore on the island. Despite the mountainous terrain of Cuba, the depression strengthened while tracking west-northwestward across the island. Later on August 28, it was upgraded to Tropical Storm Elena. The storm emerged into the Gulf of Mexico near Havana early on the following day. Elena reached hurricane status later on August 29. After becoming a Category 2 hurricane, the storm veered east-northeastward and missed the central portions of the Gulf Coast of the United States. Elena drifted erratically and posed a threat to Central Florida. However, by early on September 1, the storm re-curved to the west-northwest. It continued to intensify and early on the following day, Elena peaked with maximum sustained winds of 125 mph (200 km/h) and a minimum barometric pressure of 953 mbar (28.1 inHg). At 1300 UTC on September 2, Elena made landfall near Biloxi, Mississippi at a slightly weaker intensity. The storm rapidly weakened inland, falling to tropical storm status only 5 hours later. It meandered across the Southern United States, until dissipating over Missouri on September 4.

About 1 million fled the coast as Elena approached, with some people undergoing two emergency evacuations due to the erratic path of the storm. Although Elena remained offshore of Florida, it generated large waves along the west coast of Florida. Severe damage occurred to the oyster crop, and 40 ft (12 m) of sand was washed away along portions of the Florida Panhandle. Elena also dropped heavy rain in the Big Bend area, where precipitation peaked at 15.67 in (398 mm) in Cross City. Tornadoes in the Tampa Bay area also caused some damage, mostly to mobile home parks. Despite landfall in Mississippi as a Category 3 hurricane, sustained winds in the state only reached 91 mph (146 km/h), recorded in Harrison County, Ocean Springs, and Pascagoula. Severe wind damage occurred particularly in Pass Christian, where at least 75% of homes suffered losses. Throughout the Gulf Coast region, 294 single family homes were destroyed, while 17,189 were damaged to varying degrees. About 541 mobile homes were destroyed and an additional 2,642 suffered damage. The destruction of 239 apartments and condominiums, as well as impact to 1,909 other units were reported. Elena caused $1.3 billion in damage. In addition, there were nine total fatalities, including two in Texas from storm-induced rip currents; this was considered a low number, most likely the result of the massive evacuations prior to landfall.

=== Tropical Storm Fabian ===
- Tropical storm (SSHWS)
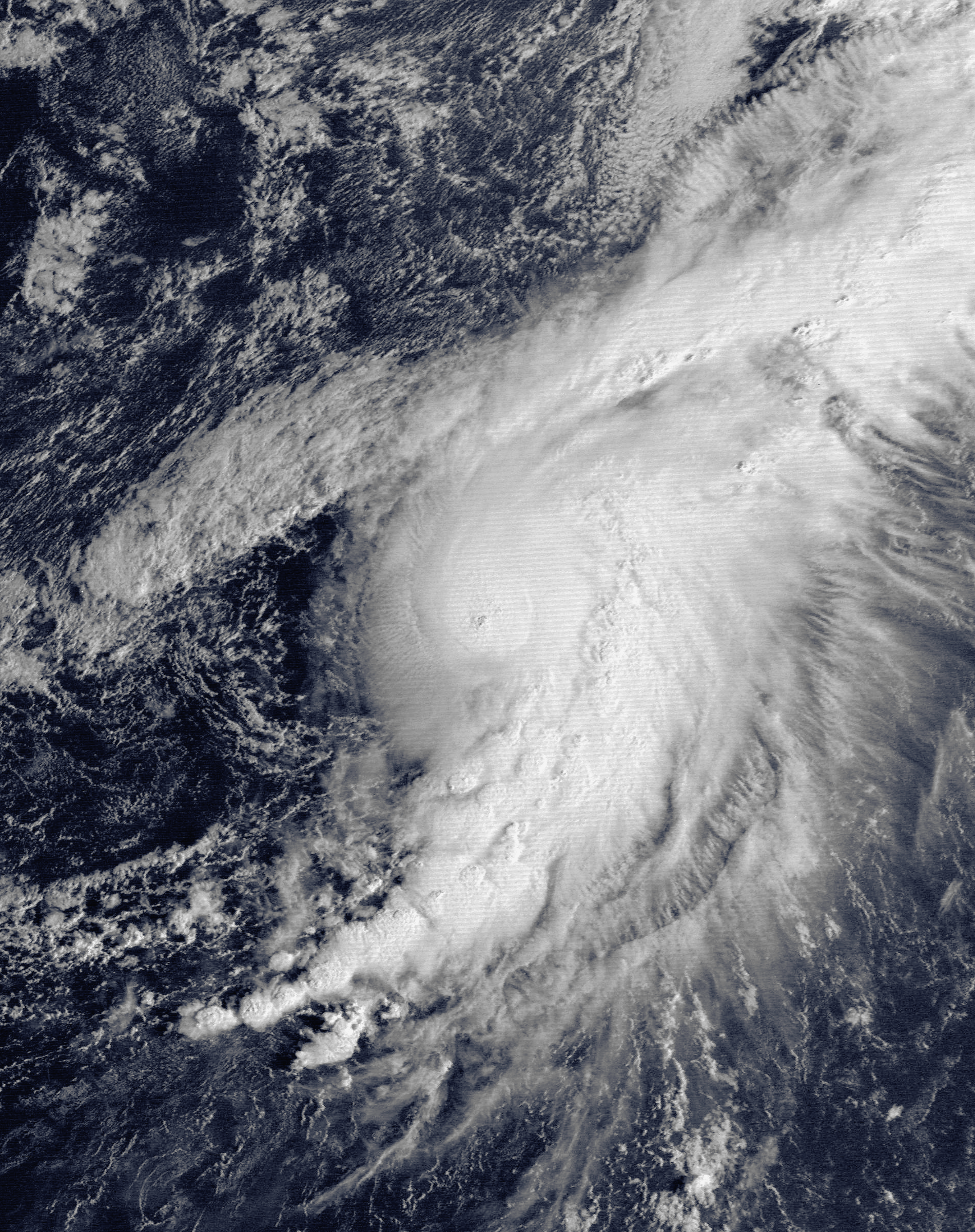
- Duration: September 15 – September 19
- Peak intensity: 65 mph (100 km/h) (1-min); 992 mbar (hPa)

The remnants of Tropical Depression Six drifted northeastward and crossed Hispaniola on September 15. Later that day, the remnants of the depression emerged into the Atlantic Ocean. It combined with the remnants of a frontal system and quickly developed into a surface low. At 1800 UTC on September 15, Tropical Depression Seven formed about 150 mi (240 km) north-northeast of Cockburn Town, Turks and Caicos Islands. The depression was steered northeastward by a frontal trough, which was extending northeastward into the Atlantic. It is estimated that the depression strengthened into Tropical Storm Fabian at 1800 UTC on September 16, which was when a reconnaissance aircraft reported an atmospheric pressure of 1,004 mbar (29.6 inHg).

At 0700 UTC on September 17, the depression was operationally upgraded to a tropical storm. Fabian strengthened further and at 0945 UTC on that day, the storm attained its peak intensity with winds of 65 mph (105 km/h) and a minimum atmospheric pressure of 992 mbar (29.3 inHg). A low-pressure area began developing along the frontal trough, causing the storm to accelerate eastward. The ship Vant recorded winds as high as 80 mph (130 km/h) while passing between Fabian and the developing low pressure system on September 17 and September 18. At around 1800 UTC on September 19, Fabian was absorbed by the low-pressure area about 405 miles (652 km) southeast of Flores Island, Azores.

=== Hurricane Gloria ===
- Category 4 hurricane (SSHWS)
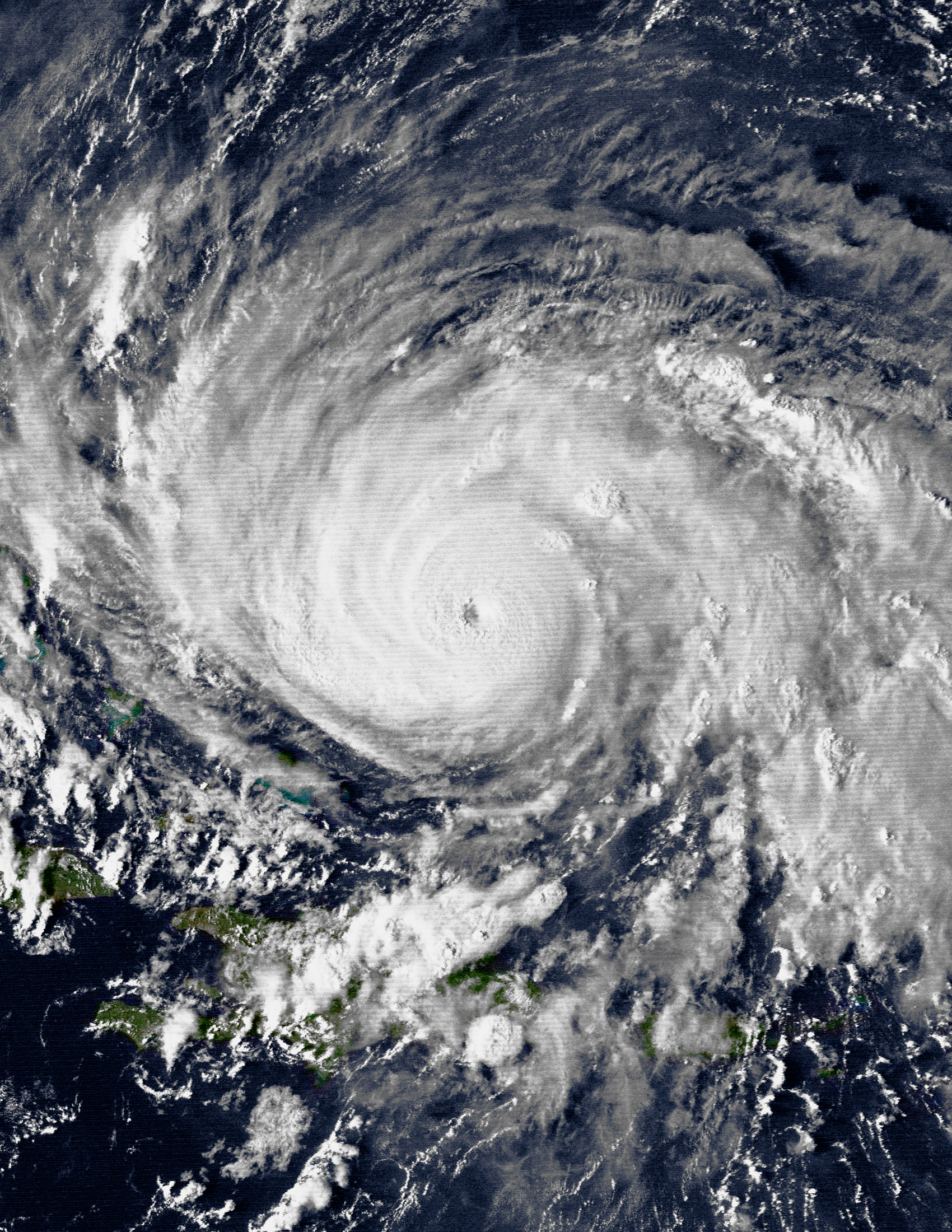
- Duration: September 16 – September 27
- Peak intensity: 145 mph (230 km/h) (1-min); 920 mbar (hPa)

A tropical wave developed into Tropical Depression Eight on September 16, while located near Cape Verde. The depression strengthened while passing south of the islands and was upgraded to Tropical Storm Gloria on September 17. During the next 24 hours, Gloria did not intensify further and instead weakened back to a tropical depression late on September 18. However, by 0000 UTC on September 20, it re-strengthened into a tropical storm. Slow deepening occurred as the storm approached the Lesser Antilles. Late on September 21, Gloria was upgraded to a Category 1 hurricane. The storm re-curved west-northwestward by the following day. Gloria then underwent rapid intensification, starting at 1800 UTC on September 23. The storm became a Category 4 hurricane by early on September 25.

At 0120 UTC on September 25, Gloria attained its peak intensity with maximum sustained winds of 145 mph (235 km/h) and a minimum barometric pressure of 919 mbar (27.1 inHg). However, later that day, the storm quickly weakened to a Category 2 hurricane. Although Gloria weakened to a Category 1 hurricane on September 26, it soon re-strengthened into a Category 2 hurricane while re-curving north-northeastward. Early on September 27, Gloria made landfall on Hatteras Island, North Carolina with winds of 105 mph (170 km/h). After re-emerging into the Atlantic Ocean, Gloria weakened back to a Category 1 hurricane later on September 27. At 1600 UTC on that day, the hurricane made another landfall on Long Island, New York with winds of 85 mph (135 km/h). Gloria continued to weaken while moving inland and became extratropical over Maine at 0000 UTC on September 28.

The storm brought strong winds to eastern North Carolina, with sustained winds up to 98 mph (158 km/h) and gusts as high as 120 mph (190 km/h). Wind damage to trees and structures were reported as far as 30 mi (48 km) inland. One man was killed after a tree fell on his mobile home near Havelock. Storm surge amounts ranging from 4 to 8 feet (1.2 to 2.4 m) also caused flood damage to numerous homes along the Outer Banks. In New York, wind gusts up to 100 mph (160 km/h) on Long Island damaged or destroyed hundreds of homes and businesses. Hundreds of aircraft sustained damage. Thousands of trees were knocked over, which struck power lines, leaving about 1.5 million people – roughly two-thirds of Long Island – without electricity. Storm tides also caused severe beach erosion, flooded hundreds of streets, and damaged or destroyed hundreds of boats. In Connecticut, thousands of trees downed by strong winds struck power lines, leaving up to 727,000 people without electricity. Along the coast, hundreds of small crafts and pleasure crafts were torn from their moorings. Additionally, a number of houses were inflicted flood damage from storm tides. Similar impact was reported in Massachusetts and Rhode Island. Overall, Gloria caused 14 deaths and about $900 million in damage.

=== Tropical Storm Henri ===
- Tropical storm (SSHWS)
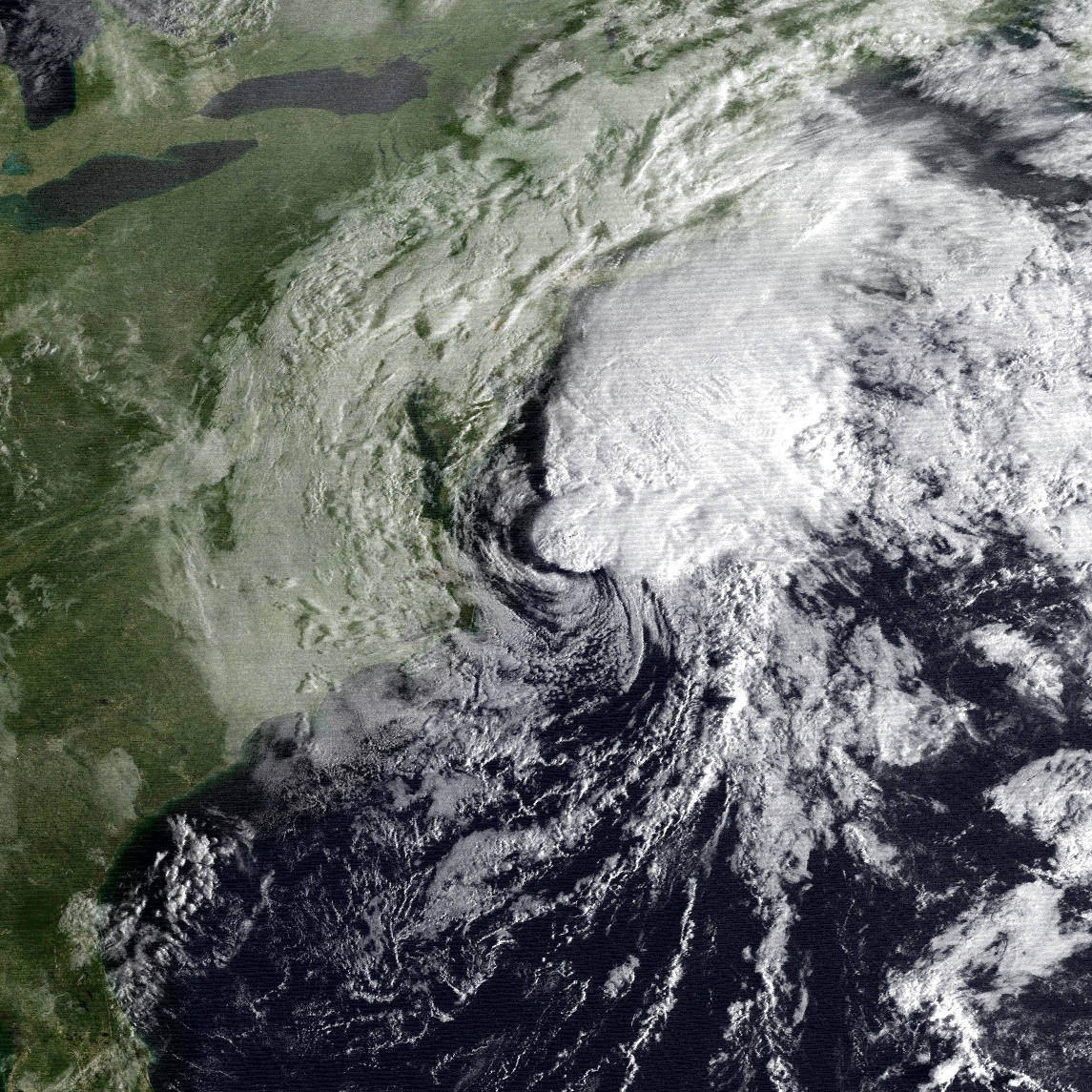
- Duration: September 21 – September 25
- Peak intensity: 60 mph (95 km/h) (1-min); 996 mbar (hPa)

A trough of low pressure located near dissipating Tropical Storm Fabian developed a circulation on September 18 and then began to drift northward. By 1800 UTC on September 21, the system became Tropical Depression Nine, while located about 415 miles (668 km) east of Palm Coast, Florida. However, the advisories were not operationally initiated until 0230 UTC on September 22, after a reconnaissance confirmed a low-level circulation. The depression strengthened and became Tropical Storm Henri early on September 23. Shortly thereafter, Henri attained its peak intensity with maximum sustained winds of 60 mph (95 km/h) and a minimum atmospheric pressure of 996 mbar (29.4 inHg).

After reaching peak intensity, wind shear began to steadily weaken the storm as it tracked north or north-northeastward. At 2100 UTC on September 24, Henri made landfall on the eastern tip of Long Island with winds of 40 mph (65 km/h). While weakening to a tropical depression, the storm made its second landfall near the Connecticut and Rhode Island border around 0000 UTC on September 25. Six hours later, Henri was absorbed by frontal zone centered over New England. Rainfall was widespread, but light, as minimal deep convection was retained as Henri was affecting land. Only one location in both Massachusetts and North Carolina reported precipitation in excess of 3 inches (76 mm). As a result, no significant damage was reported.

=== Tropical Storm Isabel ===
- Tropical storm (SSHWS)
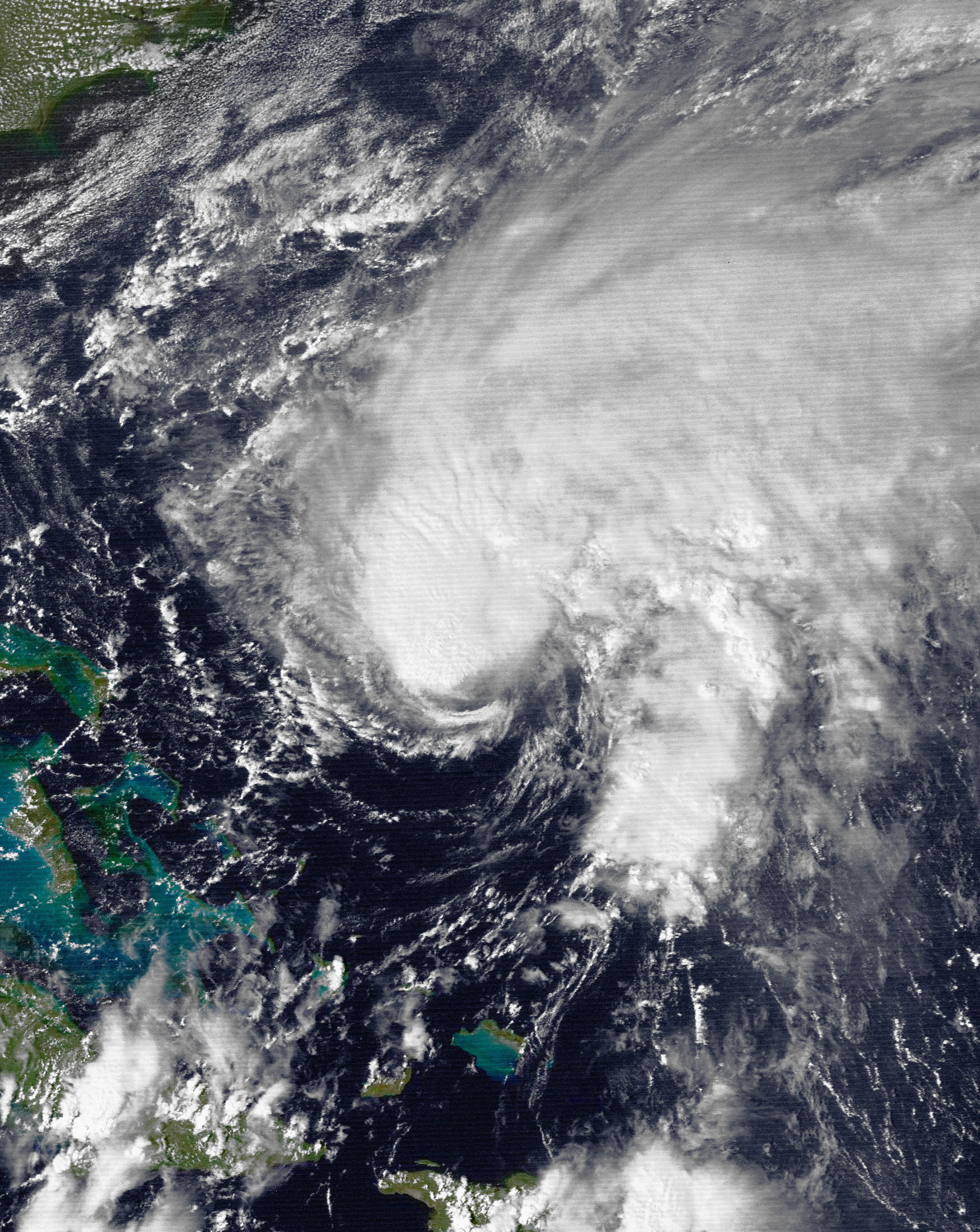
- Duration: October 7 – October 15
- Peak intensity: 70 mph (110 km/h) (1-min); 997 mbar (hPa)

A tropical wave exited Africa on September 29. It entered the Caribbean on October 5 and produced torrential rainfall across Puerto Rico; the floods killed 180 people, mostly from a mudslide in Ponce. On October 7, the wave spawned a tropical depression north of Hispaniola. Located on the western edge of a mid-Atlantic high pressure system, the storm moved northward and intensified into Tropical Storm Isabel, although initial development was hampered by interaction with Hispaniola. After moving through the southeastern Bahamas, Isabel quickly intensified and attained peak winds of 70 mph (110 km/h) late on October 8. An approaching cold front caused the storm to weaken and a ridge behind the front caused Isabel to curve westward. In addition, strong southwesterly flow gradually decreased convection around the center.

Isabel made landfall near Fernandina Beach, Florida as a 40 mph (65 km/h) tropical storm late on October 10. It quickly weakened to a tropical depression, and the circulation turned to the north and east once inland. Late on October 11, Isabel emerged from the coast near Brunswick, Georgia and subsequently drifted to the northeast. The circulation was absorbed by a cold front while located east of the Outer Banks of North Carolina on October 15. When Isabel made landfall on northeastern Florida, the storm dropped light rains across the Southeastern United States, peaking at 3.38 in (86 mm) in southeastern North Carolina. Additionally, minimal precipitation fell in Florida, Georgia, and South Carolina.

=== Hurricane Juan ===
- Category 1 hurricane (SSHWS)
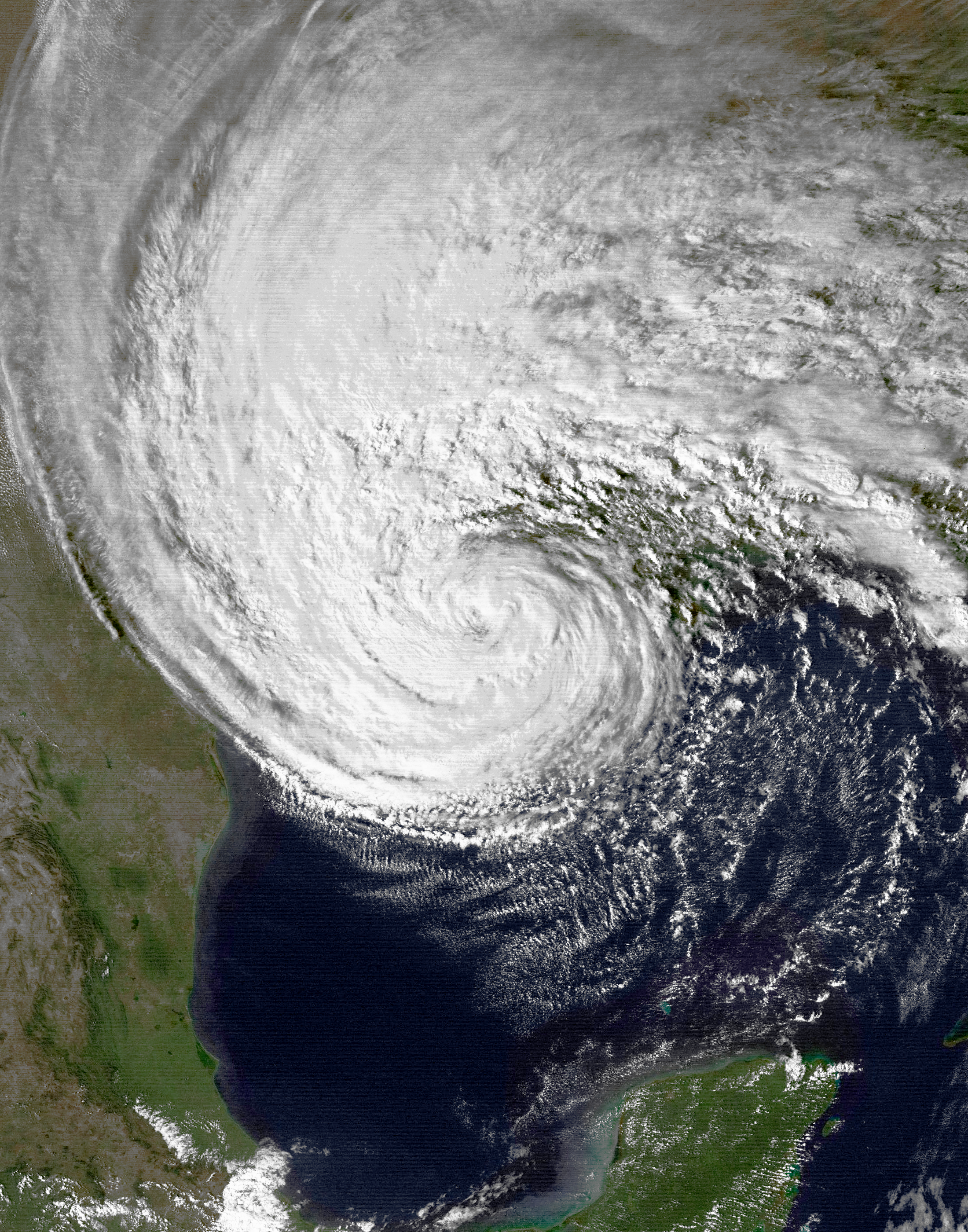
- Duration: October 26 – November 1
- Peak intensity: 85 mph (140 km/h) (1-min); 971 mbar (hPa)

An upper-level low pressure in the Gulf of Mexico developed into a tropical depression on October 26. By later that day, the depression strengthened into Tropical Storm Juan. Juan re-curved several times, but eventually moved north-northwest on October 27. The storm strengthened and by early on October 28, it became a hurricane. Later that day, sustained winds peaked at 85 mph (135 km/h). Between October 28 and October 29, the storm executed a cyclonic loop just offshore Louisiana. Shortly before 1200 UTC on that day, Juan made landfall near Morgan City, Louisiana as a minimal hurricane. It quickly weakened back to a tropical storm. The storm began to execute another cyclonic loop, reaching the Lafayette area before curving back out to the Gulf of Mexico on October 30. The storm briefly remained offshore, before a second landfall on the Mississippi River Delta in Louisiana early on October 31. Juan re-emerged into the Gulf of Mexico, before yet another landfall near Gulf Shores, Alabama. The storm weakened inland and became extratropical over Tennessee on November 1.

Juan produced large waves at oil rigs in the Gulf of Mexico, causing several damaged platforms, vessels, and killed nine people. The erratic motion of the storm offshore and inland over Louisiana resulted in heavy rainfall, peaking at 17.78 inches (452 mm) in Galliano. Significant flood ensued, damaging 5,000 homes and 100 businesses. In Jefferson Parish alone, heavy rainfall and storm surge combined flooded at least 2,233 homes, 3,100 cars, and 100 businesses. In southern Mississippi, rainfall exceeding 10 inches (250 mm) in some areas inundated 342-352 homes and 6 businesses. The remnants of Juan also produced extensive flooding in the Appalachia region of the United States. Flood levels along rivers such as the James, Potomac, and Roanoke Rivers in Virginia rivaled that of Hurricane Camille in 1969 and Hurricane Agnes in 1972. In the state of Virginia alone, damaged exceeded $800 million. West Virginia was also significantly impacted. Many streams and rivers rose to 100-500 year flood levels, with some cresting at record heights. As a result, whole towns, roads, and bridges were swept away. Nearly 9,000 homes were damaged, 4,000 of which were destroyed. Losses reached $577 million. Overall, Juan caused $1.5 billion in damage and 12 fatalities, including 1 in Texas, 2 in Louisiana, and 9 offshore.

=== Hurricane Kate ===
- Category 3 hurricane (SSHWS)
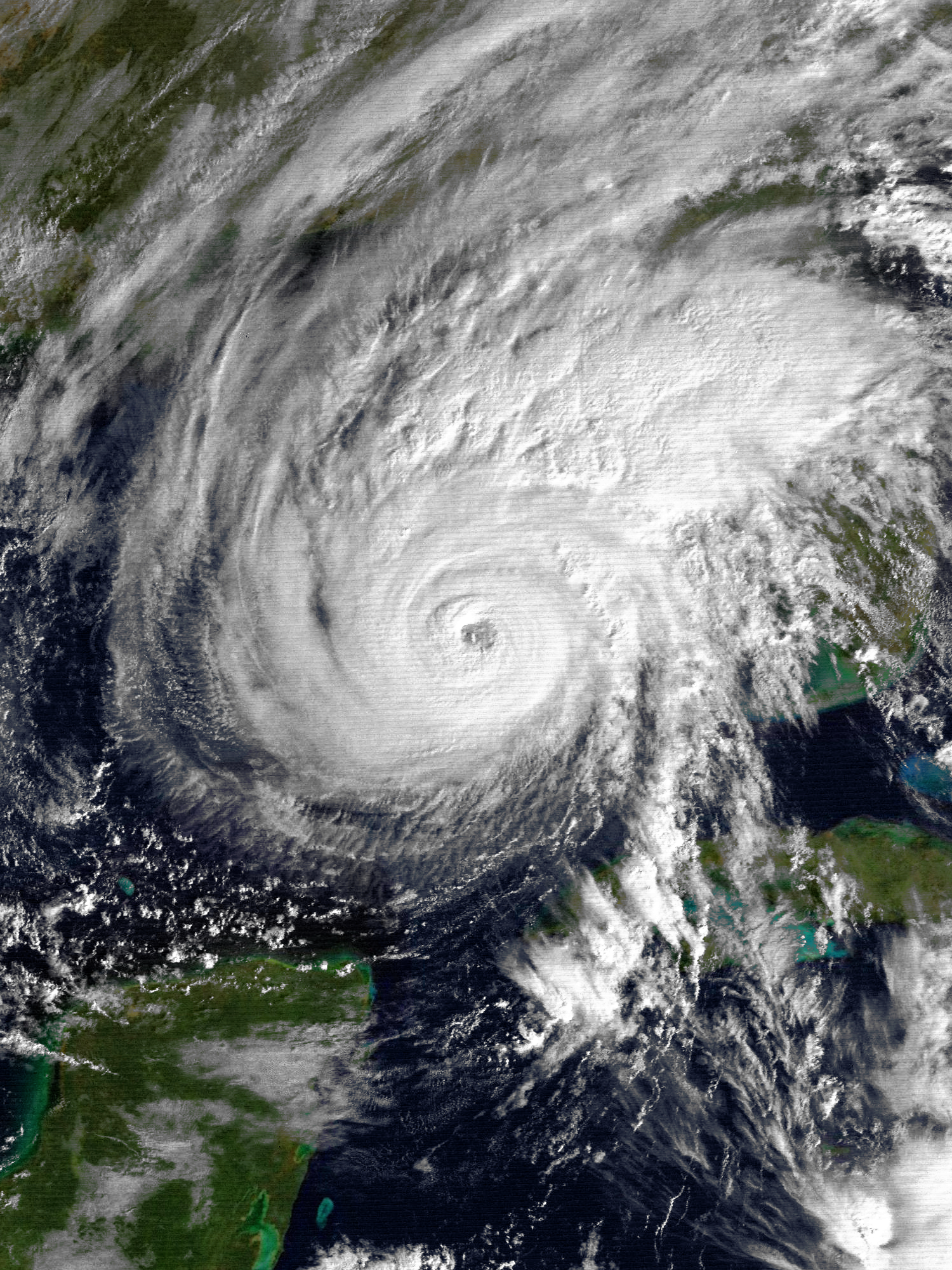
- Duration: November 15 – November 23
- Peak intensity: 120 mph (195 km/h) (1-min); 953 mbar (hPa)

The interaction of an upper-level trough and a tropical wave spawned Tropical Storm Kate at 1800 UTC on November 15, while located northeast of Puerto Rico. Kate strengthened while moving westward and was upgraded to a hurricane about 24 hours later. Early on November 19, the storm made landfall in Ciego de Ávila Province, Cuba with winds of 110 mph (175 km/h). It curved west-northwestward and weakened to a Category 1 hurricane before emerging into the Gulf of Mexico late on November 19. Kate turned northwestward and strengthened, peaking as a 120 mph (195 km/h) Category 3 hurricane on November 20. However, it weakened to a Category 2 hurricane on November 21, several hours before making landfall near Mexico Beach, Florida. The storm quickly weakened inland and was downgraded to a tropical storm on the following day. It crossed the Southeastern United States and emerged into the Atlantic Ocean near Cape Fear, North Carolina on November 23. Kate re-curved east-southeastward, before becoming extratropical while located about halfway between the Outer Banks and Bermuda.

In Jamaica, heavy rains brought flooding to five provinces, with repairs to transportation costing $3 million. Additionally, there were seven deaths on the island. In Cuba, strong winds damaged sugar mills and much of the sugar cane crop. An estimated 3,653 mi^{2} (9461 km^{2}) of sugar cane and 34,000 tonnes of sugar were ruined. The storm also destroyed 141,000 tonnes of bananas and 87,078 tonnes of other fruits and vegetables. Kate damaged 88,207 houses and destroyed 4,382 others. There were 10 deaths and about 50 injuries. Damage was estimated at $400 million. In the Florida Keys, strong winds downed trees and left power outages between Big Pine Key and Key West. Further north in the Florida Panhandle, strong winds also resulted in numerous power outages, including in Tallahassee, where 90% of the city was left without electricity. About 242 buildings were severely damaged in the Florida Panhandle, most of them in Franklin County. Storm surge left about 150 homes uninhabitable in Wakulla County alone. Five deaths occurred in Florida and damage reached about $300 million. One death occurred in Georgia; a man in Thomasville was fatally struck by a falling tree. Heavy rains brought flooding the southern portions of the state, with damage totaling $101 million.

=== Other systems ===
On September 8, a tropical depression developed about 230 mi (370 km) north-northwest of São Vicente, Cape Verde. It tracked west-northwestward and intensified slightly, reaching winds of 35 mph (55 km/h). However, no further strengthening occurred, and 1200 UTC on September 13, it dissipated while located about 345 mi (555 km) east-southeast of Bermuda.

On September 11, Tropical Depression Six formed about 10 miles (16 km) north of Tobago. Shortly after developing, it made landfall near Tivoli, Grenada with winds of 30 mph (50 km/h). The depression remained weak, intensifying minimally and maintaining an ill-defined circulation as it tracked west-northwestward across the Caribbean Sea. Eventually, the depression began disorganizing, with convection stretching across Hispaniola, Puerto Rico, and the Leeward Islands on September 14, despite the center being located south of Jamaica. Later that day, a reconnaissance aircraft did not indicate a circulation; thus, the depression dissipated while located about 195 mi (315 km) south of Kingston, Jamaica on September 14. After dissipating, the depression later redeveloped into Tropical Storm Fabian.

Tropical Depression Thirteen on December 7

On December 7, one week after the official end of the season, Tropical Depression Thirteen developed in the southwestern Caribbean Sea. It headed west-southwestward toward Panama with little change in strength. At 1800 UTC on December 9, the depression dissipated about 50 mi (80 km) northwest of Colón, Panama.

== Storm names ==
The following list of names was used for named storms that formed in the North Atlantic in 1985. This is the same list used for the 1979 season except for Danny and Fabian, which replaced David and Frederic. Both new names were used for the first time in 1985, as were Isabel, Juan, and Kate.

- Ana
- Bob
- Claudette
- Danny
- Elena
- Fabian
- Gloria
- Henri
- Isabel
- Juan
- Kate
- Larry (unused)
- Mindy (unused)
- Nicholas (unused)
- Odette (unused)
- Peter (unused)
- Rose (unused)
- Sam (unused)
- Teresa (unused)
- Victor (unused)
- Wanda (unused)

=== Retirement ===
The World Meteorological Organization retired Elena and Gloria from the naming rotation in the spring of 1986 on account of their destructiveness. They were replaced by Erika and Grace for the 1991 season.

== Season effects ==
This is a table of all of the storms that formed in the 1985 Atlantic hurricane season. It includes their name, duration, peak classification and intensities, areas affected, damage, and death totals. Deaths in parentheses are additional and indirect (an example of an indirect death would be a traffic accident), but were still related to that storm. Damage and deaths include totals while the storm was extratropical, a wave, or a low, and all of the damage figures are in 1985 USD.

Saffir–Simpson scale
TD	TS	C1	C2	C3	C4	C5

1985 North Atlantic tropical cyclone season statistics
Storm name	Dates active	Storm category at peak intensity	Max 1-min wind mph (km/h)	Min. press. (mbar)	Areas affected	Damage (US$)	Deaths	Ref(s).
Ana	July 15 – 19	Tropical storm	70 (110)	996	Nova Scotia, Newfoundland	None	None	
Bob	July 21 – 26	Category 1 hurricane	75 (120)	1002	Southeastern United States, Mid-Atlantic states, New England	$20 million	0 (5)	
Claudette	August 9 – 16	Category 1 hurricane	85 (140)	980	Bermuda, Azores	None	None	
Danny	August 12 – 18	Category 1 hurricane	90 (150)	987	Southern United States	$100 million	2 (3)	
Elena	August 28 – September 4	Category 3 hurricane	125 (205)	953	Greater Antilles, Southern United States	$1.3 billion	9	
Unnumbered	September 8 – 13	Tropical depression	35 (55)	N/A	None	None	None	
Six	September 11 – 13	Tropical depression	35 (55)	N/A	None	None	None	
Fabian	September 15 – 19	Tropical storm	65 (100)	992	None	None	None	
Gloria	September 16–27	Category 4 hurricane	145 (230)	919	East Coast of the United States, Eastern Canada	$900 million	14	
Henri	September 21 – 25	Tropical storm	60 (90)	997	Mid-Atlantic, New England	None	None	
Isabel	October 7 – 15	Tropical storm	70 (110)	997	Dominican Republic, Puerto Rico, Southeastern United States	None	None	
Juan	October 26 – November 1	Category 1 hurricane	85 (140)	971	Southern United States, Midwestern United States, Mid-Atlantic	$1.5 billion	12	
Kate	November 15–23	Category 3 hurricane	120 (195)	953	Greater Antilles, Southeastern United States	$700 million	15	
Thirteen	December 7 – 9	Tropical depression	35 (55)	N/A	None	None	None	
Season aggregates
14 systems	July 15 – December 9		145 (230)	919		$4.52 billion	52 (8)	

== See also ==
- Weather of 1985
- 1985 Pacific hurricane season
- 1985 Pacific typhoon season
- 1985 North Indian Ocean cyclone season
- South-West Indian Ocean cyclone seasons: 1984–85, 1985–86
- Australian region cyclone seasons: 1984–85, 1985–86
- South Pacific cyclone seasons: 1984–85, 1985–86
- South Atlantic tropical cyclone
- Mediterranean tropical-like cyclone
