= List of Florida hurricanes (1975–1999) =

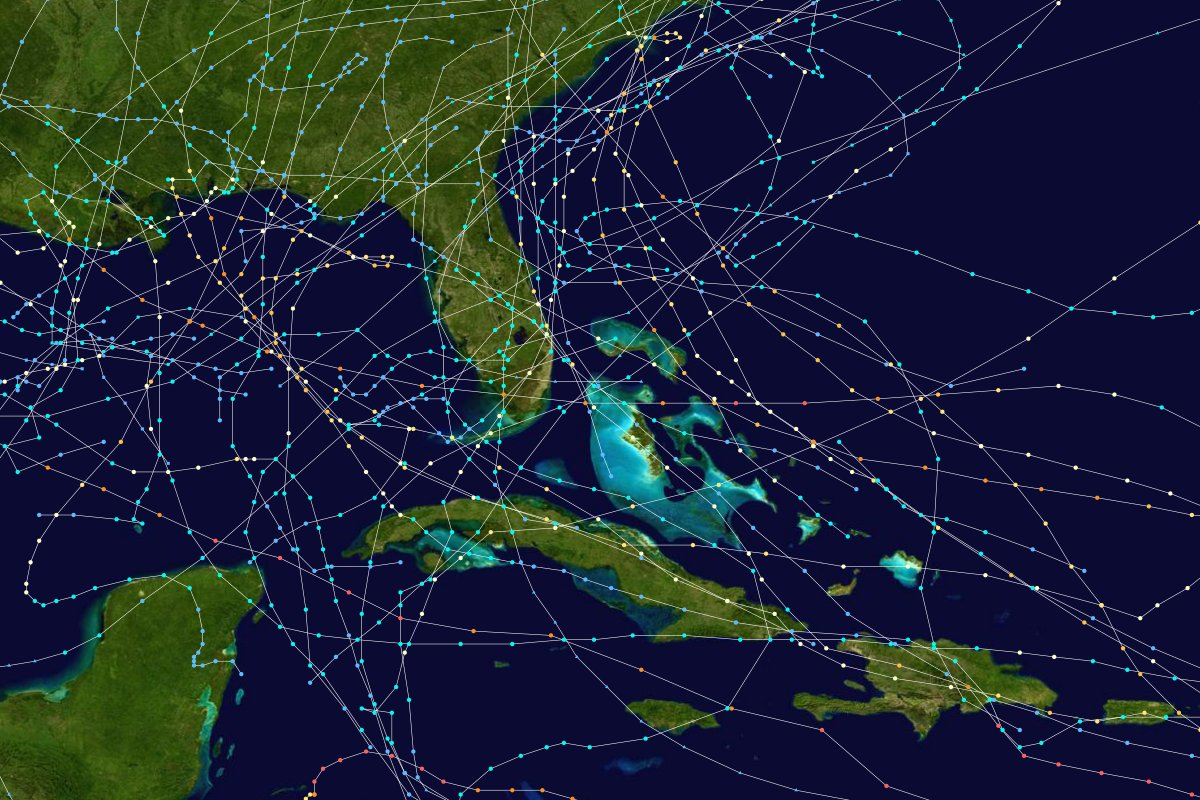
Tracks of hurricanes over Florida from 1975 to 1999

From 1975 to 1999, 83 Atlantic hurricanes have affected the U.S. state of Florida. Collectively, tropical cyclones in Florida during the time period resulted in at least $45 billion (2008 USD) in damage, primarily from Hurricane Andrew. Additionally, tropical cyclones in Florida were directly responsible for 54 fatalities during the period. Several tropical cyclones produced over 20 inches (510 mm) of rainfall in the state, including Hurricane Georges which is the highest total during the time period. The 1985 season was the year with the most tropical cyclones affecting the state, with a total of eight systems. Every year included at least one tropical cyclone affecting the state.

The strongest hurricane to hit the state during the time period was Hurricane Andrew, which was one of only four Category 5 hurricanes to strike the United States. Andrew, at the time, was the costliest tropical cyclone in United States history. Additionally, Hurricane Eloise and Hurricane Opal hit the state as major hurricanes.

== 1975–1979 ==
=== 1975 ===
- June 27, 1975- The tropical depression that later became Tropical Storm Amy dropped light rainfall in the eastern portion of the state.
- July 29, 1975- A tropical depression moved into southern Mississippi after creating a strong convergence zone with a ridge over the western Atlantic Ocean. The convergence zone produced heavy rainfall of up to 20 inches (510 mm) along the western Florida Panhandle, resulting in moderate stream flooding and $8.5 million in damage in the state (1975 USD, $34 million 2008 USD).

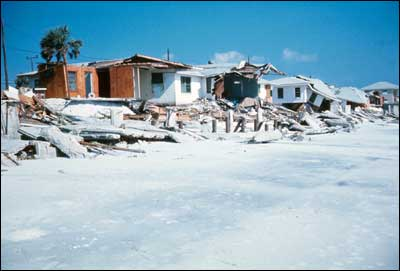
Damage from Hurricane Eloise

- September 23, 1975- Hurricane Eloise made landfall near Destin with winds of about 125 mph (200 km/h), producing light precipitation across the peninsula with heavier amounts near the landfall location peaking at 14.9 inches (380 mm) at Eglin Air Force Base. Hurricane-force winds and storm surge of up to 16 feet (4.9 m) across the panhandle destroyed 500 small businesses and damaged or destroyed 8,000 houses. Damage in the state totaled $100 million (1975 USD, $400 million 2008 USD).
- October 1, 1975- A tropical depression hit the western Florida Panhandle, though its effects, if any, are unknown.
- October 16, 1975- Southern Louisiana was struck by a tropical depression, with its outer rain squalls and slightly above normal tides reaching the northwestern portion of Florida.

=== 1976 ===
- May 23, 1976- Subtropical Storm One struck near Saint Marks, producing slightly above normal tides, minor beach erosion, and beneficial precipitation.
- June 11, 1976- A tropical depression moved northeastward across the southern portion of the state, resulting in only minor effects.
- August 19, 1976- Tropical Storm Dottie hit the southwestern portion of the state, dropping heavy precipitation across its path including around 8 inches (200 mm) in the Coral Gables. The rainfall led to flooding and road closures near Miami.
- September 13, 1976- The combination of a mid-level low and a stationary front led to the development of Subtropical Depression Three over the center of the state. It tracked north-northeastward and intensified into a subtropical storm, though its effects in the state, if any, are unknown.

=== 1977 ===
- August 27, 1977- The precursor tropical disturbance of Hurricane Anita crossed the state and dropped light precipitation.

Hurricane David at Florida landfall

- September 5, 1977- The outer rainbands of Hurricane Babe produced moderate rainfall throughout the state as it made landfall in southern Louisiana.

=== 1978 ===
- June 22, 1978- A tropical depression dissipated shortly after striking the southwestern portion of the state. Damage, if any, is unknown.

=== 1979 ===
- July 11, 1979- Hurricane Bob hit southern Louisiana, with its outer rainbands dropping 3 inches (76 mm) of rain along the western Florida Panhandle.
- September 3, 1979- Hurricane David brushed the eastern coastline after moving ashore near Palm Beach, producing heavy rainfall with one location reporting over 10 inches (250 mm) of precipitation, as well as strong winds which resulted in $95 million in damage (1979 USD, $282 million 2008 USD), primarily in Palm Beach County. The hurricane caused five casualties in the state.
- September 12, 1979- Hurricane Frederic made landfall near the Alabama/Mississippi border, having produced tropical storm force winds in the Dry Tortugas a few days before. The hurricane dropped rainfall throughout the state and killed one person off Pensacola when a person was swept from their boat.
- September 24, 1979- The remnants of Hurricane Henri brought rainfall and river flooding to the western portion of the state.

== 1980–1989 ==
=== 1980 ===
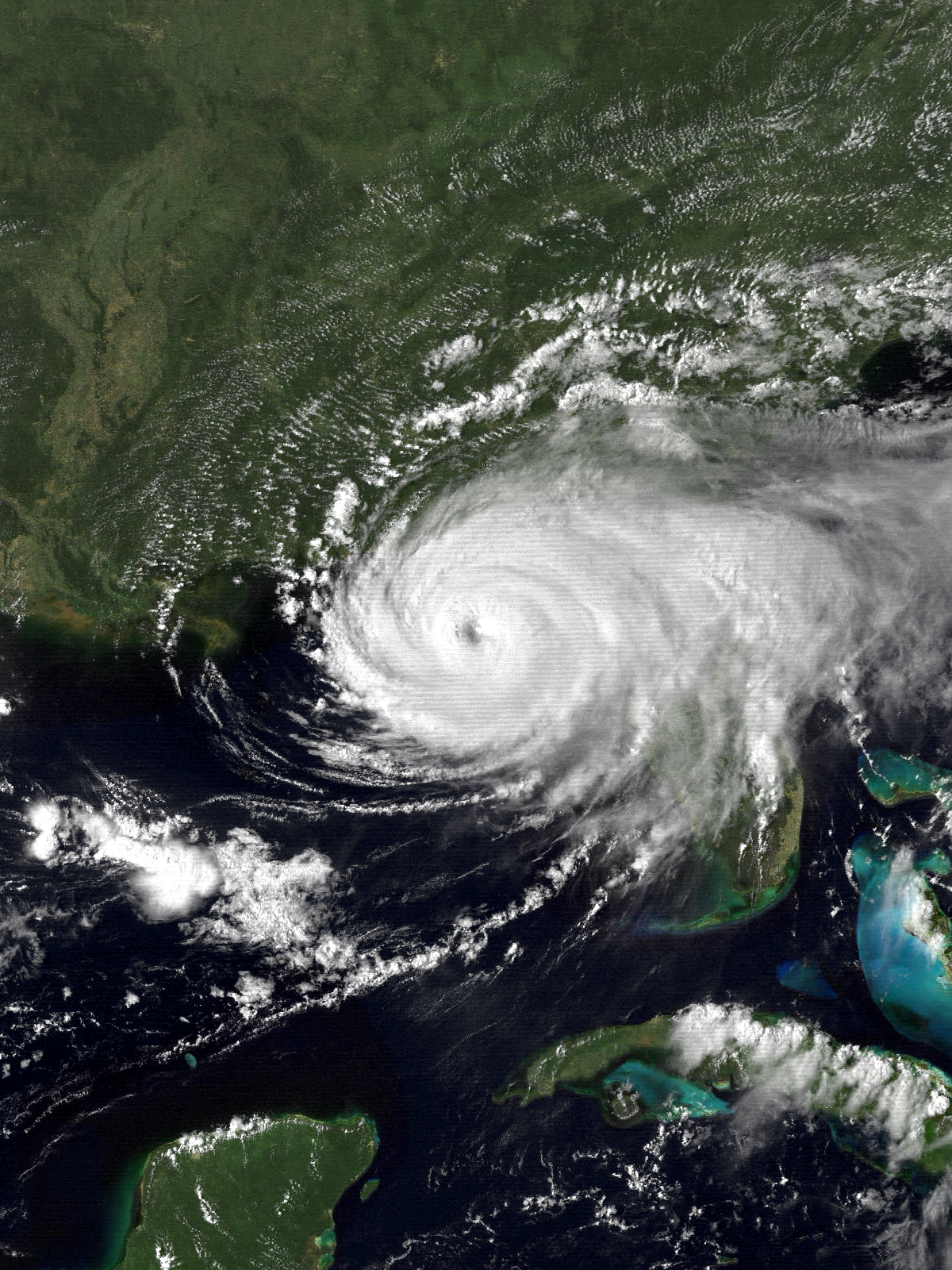
Hurricane Elena near the Floridian coast on September 1

- August 7, 1980- Hurricane Allen passed about 310 miles (500 km) south of Key West, Florida. The threat of the large hurricane prompted the National Hurricane Center to issue gale warnings for the Florida Keys. The hurricane produced gale-force winds across the keys, though there was no significant damage.
- November 8–12, 1980- An inflow band from Hurricane Jeanne over the central Gulf of Mexico combined with a stationary cold front, producing torrential rainfall across southern Florida. Key West International Airport recorded a peak total of 24.98 inches (634 mm), with over half of it falling in one six-hour period.
- November 18, 1980- A tropical depression brought moderate precipitation to the state after merging with Hurricane Jeanne.

=== 1981 ===
- August 17, 1981- Tropical Storm Dennis made landfall in the southwest portion of the state, and drifted northeastward across the state. The rainfall was generally beneficial, though totals of over 20 inches (510 mm) caused moderate flooding damage in southeastern Florida, including $15 million ($36 million 2008 USD) in crop damages in Dade County.
- November 1981- An unnamed subtropical storm produced coastal flooding and beach erosion along the eastern coastline while located over the open Atlantic Ocean.

=== 1982 ===
- Early June 1982- Hurricane Alberto stalled over the eastern Gulf of Mexico, though its outer bands produced moderate rainfall across the state, peaking at 16.47 inches (418 mm) in Tavernier. The hurricane produced tornadic activity across the state, and the storm resulted in generally minor damage.
- June 18, 1982- A subtropical storm made landfall near Yankeetown, and produced moderate precipitation of up to 10.72 inches (272 mm) near DeSoto City. The rainfall led to three deaths, and damage from the storm totaled to $10 million (1982 USD, $22 million 2008 USD).
- September 11, 1982- Tropical Storm Chris struck Louisiana, with its outer rainbands dropping over 7 inches (180 mm) of precipitation near Apalachicola.

=== 1983 ===
- August 28, 1983- Tropical Depression Barry made landfall as a tropical depression near Melbourne. It dropped light rainfall across the southern portion of the state, peaking at 3.01 inches (76 mm) in Wauchula.

=== 1984 ===
- September 9, 1984- Tropical Storm Diana passed within 65 miles (105 km) off the northeast Florida coast. The storm produced moderate rainfall of up to 3.13 inches (80 mm) in Jacksonville. Diana also produced wind gusts of up to 69 mph (111 km/h) as well as tides 2.6 feet (0.79 m) above normal.
- September 27, 1984- Tropical Storm Isidore made landfall on Jupiter with 60 mph (95 km/h) winds. Isidore dropped moderate rainfall of over to 6.5 inches (170 mm), and produced a storm tide of around 3.2 feet (0.98 m). Isidore killed one person and caused $1 million in damage (1984 USD, $2.1 million 2008 USD) across the state.
- October 26, 1984- A tropical depression crossed the state without dropping much precipitation.

=== 1985 ===
- July 23, 1985- Tropical Storm Bob made landfall near Fort Myers, and while slowly moving across the state it dropped heavy rainfall peaking at 21.5 inches (550 mm) in Everglades City. Despite the rainfall, damage was minimal.
- August 15, 1985- Hurricane Danny struck southern Alabama, with its outer rainbands dropping over 3 inches (76 mm) of rainfall in western Florida.
- August 28 – September 6, 1985- Hurricane Elena moved northeastward through the Gulf of Mexico, looped about 50 miles (80 km) off the coast of Cedar Key, and turned northwestward to hit Mississippi. The hurricane produced precipitation across the entire state, with a peak of 15.67 inches (398 mm) in Cross Key. Elena caused a 9.8 feet (3.0 m) storm surge near Apalachicola, where the oyster industry experienced severe losses from the hurricane.

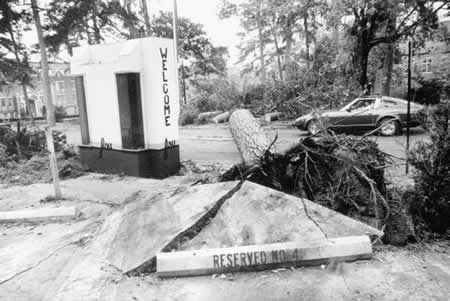
Damage from Hurricane Kate

- October 10, 1985- Minimal Tropical Storm Isabel hit extreme northeastern Florida, dropping light rain along its path; damage was minor.
- Late October 1985- Hurricane Juan moved erratically over the northern Gulf of Mexico and hit Pensacola as a tropical storm. It produced precipitation across much of the state, peaking at over 10 inches (250 mm) in the extreme western Florida Panhandle.
- November 21, 1985- Hurricane Kate made landfall near Apalachicola as a Category 2 hurricane, producing up to 8.32 inches (211 mm) of rainfall in Panama City. Tides of over 10 feet (3.0 m) above normal resulted in further beach erosion near the coast. Just two months after Hurricane Elena affected the area, the passage of Hurricane Kate caused further damage to oyster beds, leaving many people without employment. Kate caused $300 million (1985 USD, $600 million 2008 USD) in damage and three deaths in the state.

=== 1986 ===
- June 26, 1986- Hurricane Bonnie struck the Texas coast, with its outer rainbands producing over 1 inch (25 mm) of rain in the extreme northwestern Florida Panhandle.
- August 13, 1986- The precursor disturbance that later became Hurricane Charley moved over northwestern Florida, causing light to moderate amounts of precipitation of up to 8.61 inches (219 mm) near Steinhatchee.

=== 1987 ===
- August 14, 1987- A tropical depression entered the Florida Panhandle from the northwest. It produced rainfall across much of the state, with the extreme western Florida Panhandle receiving over 10 inches (250 mm) of rain.
- September 7, 1987- Tropical Depression Nine formed to the east of the state, producing over 3 inches (76 mm) of rain near Homestead.
- October 12, 1987- Hurricane Floyd moved through the Florida Keys, dropping up to 10.07 inches (256 mm) of rain in Fort Pierce.
- November 4, 1987- The extratropical remnant of Tropical Depression Fourteen made landfall near Spring Hill, Florida, dropping up to 10.23 inches (260 mm) of rain at Loxahatchee National Wildlife Refuge.

=== 1988 ===
- May 30, 1988- A tropical depression moved northward to the east of the state, producing light rainfall peaking at 3.18 inches (81 mm) in Pompano Beach.
- August 4, 1988- Tropical Storm Beryl formed to the south of Mississippi and moved slowly for several days over coastal areas of Louisiana. The outer bands of the storm dropped over 7 inches (180 mm) of rain along the Florida Panhandle, resulting in very minor damage.
- August 13, 1988- Tropical Depression Four made landfall in extreme northeastern Florida, producing light to moderate rainfall throughout the entire state peaking at 7.72 inches (196 mm) in Homestead.
- August 23, 1988- Tropical Storm Chris paralleled the east coast of the state and dropped over 3 inches (76 mm) of precipitation in various locations.
- September 4, 1988- Tropical Depression Ten struck Louisiana, producing moderate rainfall across northern Florida with totals of over 5 inches (130 mm) near Apalachicola.
- September 10, 1988- The outer rainbands of Hurricane Florence produced heavy rainfall of over 10 inches (250 mm) in the extreme northwestern region of the Florida Panhandle, destroying 30 houses and damaging 50 homes from river flooding. The hurricane also spawned several tornadoes.
- September 13, 1988- Squalls from the enormous Hurricane Gilbert brought rain to South Florida as the storm lashed the Cayman Islands in the western Caribbean.
- November 23, 1988- Tropical Storm Keith made landfall near Sarasota as a 65 mph (105 km/h) tropical storm. The storm dropped up to 10.27 inches (261 mm) of precipitation in Saint Leo. Keith produced two tornadoes, and overall damage from the storm totaled $3 million (1988 USD, $5.5 million 2008 USD).

=== 1989 ===
- Late June-Early July 1989- The remnants of Tropical Storm Allison produced moderate precipitation of over 3 inches (76 mm) across much of the entire state.
- September 22, 1989- Hurricane Hugo made landfall in South Carolina, dropping trace amounts of rainfall in Jacksonville. Wind gusts peaked at 30 mph (50 km/h) in Saint Augustine.

== 1990–1999 ==
=== 1990 ===
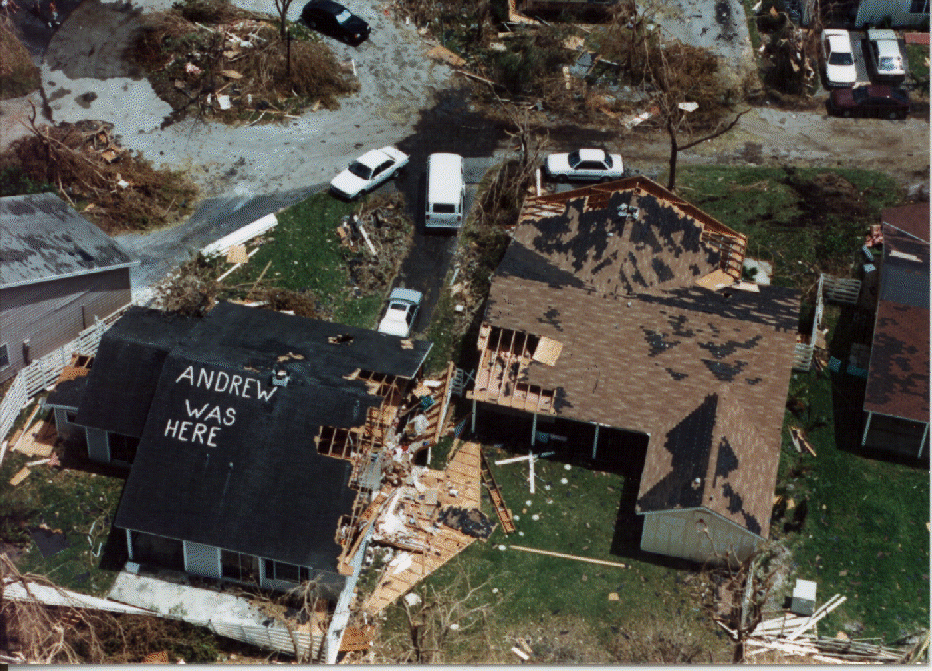
Damage from Hurricane Andrew

- May 25, 1990- Tropical Depression One passed to the southwest of the state, producing 6.2 inches (160 mm) of rainfall in Royal Palm Beach with its convection located primarily to the east of the center.
- July 1990- Rip currents from Hurricane Bertha killed two surfers in northern Florida.
- October 9, 1990- Hurricane Klaus dissipated to the east of the state, though its remnants resulted in moderate winds throughout the state and rough seas in eastern Florida. Klaus caused beach erosion and heavy rain squalls, as well.
- October 12, 1990- Tropical Depression Marco made landfall near Cedar Key after paralleling the coast as a tropical storm. It dropped moderate precipitation throughout the state which peaked at over 5 inches (130 mm) near Saint Petersburg.

=== 1991 ===
- June 30, 1991- A tropical depression which later became Tropical Storm Ana moved over southeastern Florida and exited near Jacksonville, dropping light to moderate rainfall peaking at 7.86 inches (200 mm) in Punta Gorda.
- October 16, 1991- Tropical Storm Fabian moved through the Florida Straits and produced light rainfall peaking at 4.19 inches (106 mm) in Conch Key.

=== 1992 ===
- June 25, 1992 – Tropical Depression One struck western Florida, dropping heavy rainfall peaking at 25 inches (640 mm) in Arcadia. The rainfall caused over $2.1 million in damage (1992 USD) and two deaths.

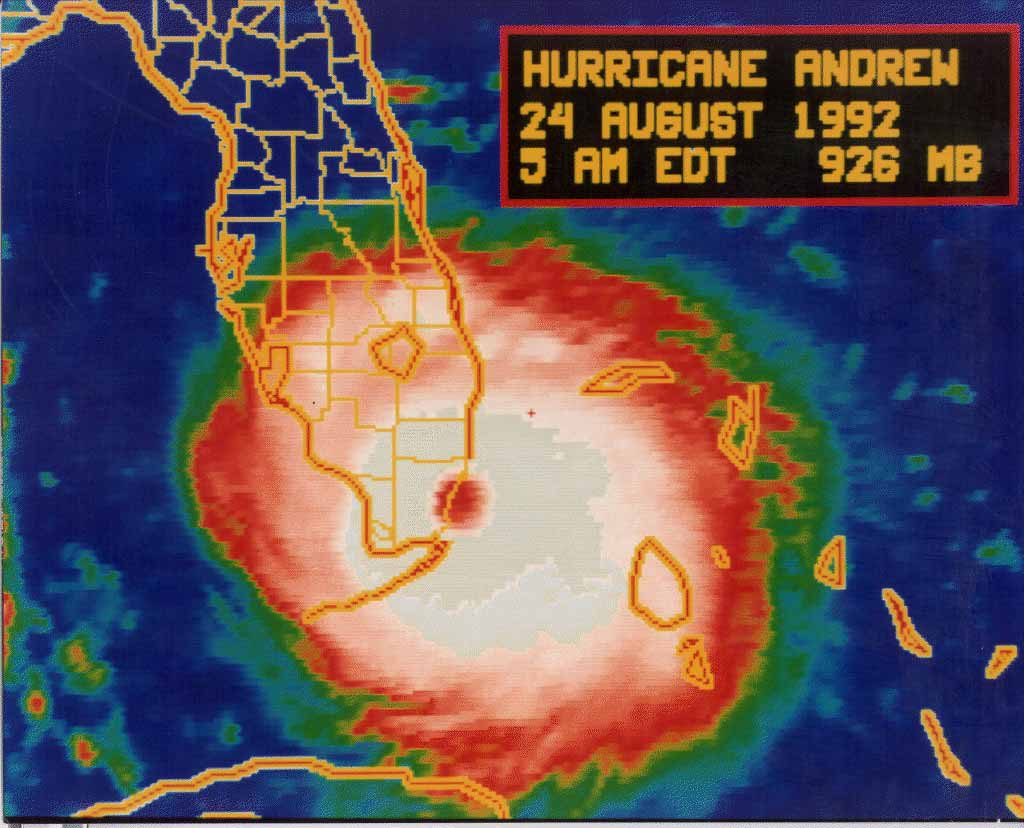
Hurricane Andrew making landfall

- August 24, 1992 – Hurricane Andrew made landfall on Homestead, just south of Miami, as a Category 5 hurricane with winds of 165 mph (265 km/h). The winds destroyed 25,524 homes and damaged 101,241 others in southern Florida, leaving up to one-quarter million people temporarily homeless. In Homestead, more than 99% of all mobile homes were completely destroyed. Hurricane Andrew caused $25.5 billion in damage (1992 USD, $39.2 billion 2008 USD) in south Florida and 15 direct deaths. At the time, Andrew was the costliest North Atlantic hurricane in the history of the United States, though has since dropped to eleventh after Hurricanes Katrina, Ike, Sandy, Harvey, Irma, Maria, Ida, Ian, Helene, and Milton.
- September 29, 1992 – Tropical Storm Earl turned to the north while located off the coast of northeastern Florida, dropping over 7 inches (180 mm) of rain near Lake Okeechobee.

=== 1993 ===
- June 1, 1993- Tropical Depression One passed to the southeast of the state, producing heavy rainfall peaking at 9.4 inches (240 mm) in Tavernier.

=== 1994 ===
- July 3, 1994- Tropical Storm Alberto made landfall near Destin, dropping moderate rainfall across the state including over 20 inches (510 mm) along the Florida Panhandle. Heavy rainfall throughout the area resulted in extensive flooding, with the Apalachicola and Chipola Rivers exceeding a 100-year flood event. 300,000 chickens and 90% of the oyster crop in Apalachicola Bay perished. Damage in Florida totaled $80 million (1994 USD, $116 million 2008 USD)).
- August 15, 1994- Tropical Storm Beryl struck Panama City, producing moderate rainfall reaching a maximum of 10.69 inches (272 mm) in Apalachicola. The storm resulted in $6.9 million in damage (1994 USD).
- October 2, 1994- The remnants of Tropical Depression Ten produced rough seas and heavy rainfall, flooding roads and homes in western Florida. Damage totaled $5 million (1994 USD, $7.3 million 2008 USD).
- November 16, 1994- Tropical Storm Gordon made landfall near Fort Myers. The storm dropped heavy rainfall across the southern portion of the state, including over 16 inches (410 mm) in Broward County. The rainfall resulted in heavy agricultural damage, and throughout the state Gordon caused eight casualties and around $400 million in damage (1994 USD, $582 million 2008 USD).

=== 1995 ===
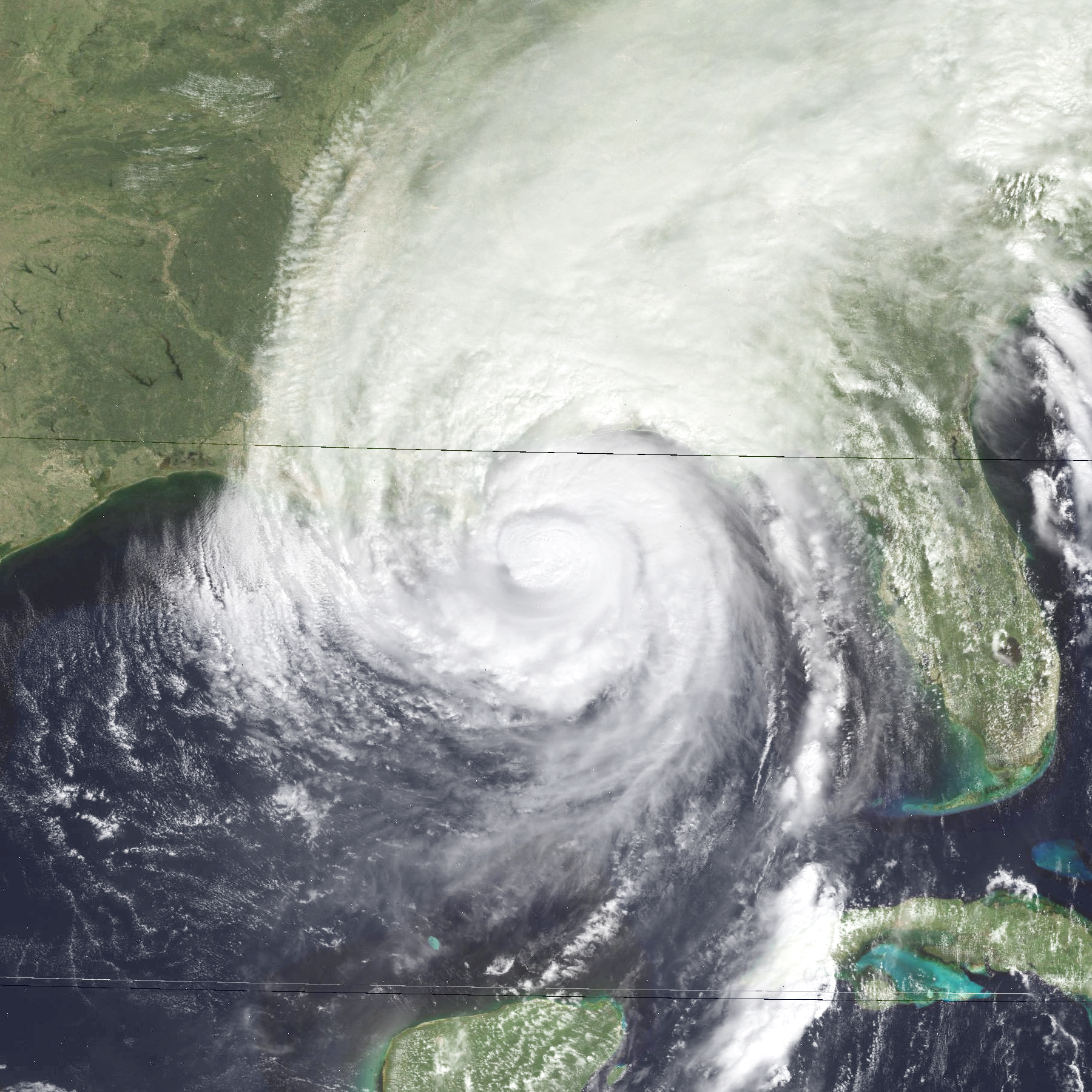
Hurricane Opal approaching Florida on October 4

- June 5, 1995- Tropical Storm Allison first struck near Alligator Point and later near Saint Marks. Allison produced a 6.8 feet (2.1 m) storm surge in Apalachee Bay as well as scattered tornadoes, with damage amounting to $860,000 (1995 USD, $1.2 million 2008 USD).
- July 27, 1995- The precursor disturbance to Tropical Storm Dean produced over 5 inches (130 mm) of precipitation in portions of western Florida.
- August 2, 1995- Hurricane Erin struck near Vero Beach and days later near Fort Walton Beach, producing moderate rainfall including totals of 10.14 inches (258 mm) in Melbourne and 20 inches (510 mm) in DeFuniak Springs on the Florida Panhandle. Thousands of homes were damaged near the hurricane's two landfalls, with monetary damage totaling about $700 million (1995 USD, $990 million 2008 USD). Rip currents killed a surfer off Palm Beach County, and two people died in the Gulf of Mexico when their boat capsized.
- August 23, 1995- Tropical Storm Jerry made landfall near Jupiter and dropped heavy rainfall throughout the state which peaked at 16.8 inches (430 mm) near Naples. Freshwater flooding from the rainfall damaged 340 homes in Collier County, with damage amounting to $20.5 million (1995 USD, $29 million 2008 USD).
- October 4, 1995- Hurricane Opal hit Pensacola Beach with winds of 115 mph (185 km/h). The hurricane dropped moderate rainfall across much of the state, and a tornado spawned by Opal killed one person — the only direct casualty in the state from the hurricane. Strong winds and rough seas damaged or destroyed large portions of coastal towns along the Florida Panhandle, with serious damage extending eastward to Apalachicola. At the time, Opal was the third costliest tropical cyclone in the United States, with damage totaling over $1 billion (1995 USD) in Florida.

=== 1996 ===
- July 11, 1996- Hurricane Bertha paralleled the east coast of Florida about 175 miles (282 km) offshore, producing a storm tide of 2 feet (0.61 m) at Jacksonville Beach, as well as rip currents along the coast. Two people drowned in rip currents in Miami Beach, and one pilot died indirectly due to the storm when an evacuating military jet crashed into a house.
- September 2, 1996- Large swells from Hurricane Fran in the open Atlantic Ocean knocked five people out of a fishing boat off Jupiter Inlet; all were rescued.
- October 8, 1996- Tropical Storm Josephine struck the eastern portion of Apalachicola Bay with winds of 70 mph (115 km/h), producing a peak storm tide of 9.3 feet (2.8 m) in Suwannee and spawning at least 16 tornadoes. A tornado in Edgewater severely damaged 30 houses, with the storm surge resulting in widespread coastal flooding.
- October 18, 1996- Hurricane Lili moved northeastward to the south of the state after striking Cuba, dropping moderate rainfall including a maximum of 12.08 inches (307 mm) in southeastern Florida.

=== 1997 ===
- July 19, 1997- Hurricane Danny hit near Mullet Point, Alabama, producing tropical storm force winds and moderate rainfall peaking at 6.78 inches (172 mm) in Pensacola.

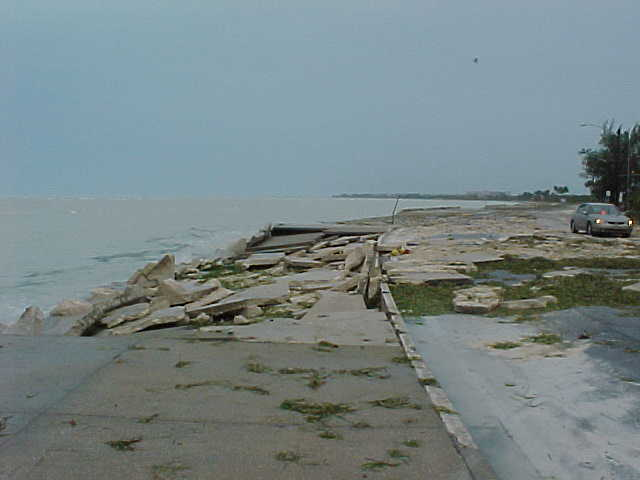
Seawall Damage in Key West from Hurricane Georges

=== 1998 ===
- September 3, 1998 – Hurricane Earl made landfall near Panama City, resulting in an estimated storm surge of around 8 feet (2.4 m) and moderate to heavy rainfall peaking at 16.38 inches (416 mm) where it struck land. Two people died as a result of a boat being capsized off Panama City, and damage in Florida totaled $70 million (1998 USD, $93 million 2008 USD).
- September 20, 1998 – The outer rainbands of Tropical Storm Hermine produced moderate amounts of rainfall throughout the state, peaking at 14.14 inches (359 mm) in Fort Lauderdale.
- September 25, 1998 – Hurricane Georges passed over Key West as a Category 2 hurricane, and days later it moved eastward through the Florida Panhandle after hitting Biloxi, Mississippi. In the Florida Keys, the hurricane produced 8.41 inches (214 mm) of rain in Tavernier and wind gusts peaking at 110 mph (175 km/h) in Marathon. There, Georges damaged 1,363 homes and destroyed 173 houses, with damage amounting to $270 million (1998 USD) in the Keys. In the Florida Panhandle, the storm dropped 38.46 inches (977 mm) of rain in Munson and resulted in $70 million in damage (1998 USD, $93 million 2008 USD).
- November 5, 1998 – Tropical Storm Mitch made landfall near Naples and dropped up to 11.2 inches (280 mm) of rainfall in Boca Raton. The storm spawned five tornadoes, injuring 65 people and damaging or destroying 645 homes. Two people died in Monroe County when their respective fishing boats capsized, and damage in the state amounted to $40 million (1998 USD, $53 million 2008 USD).

=== 1999 ===
- August 29, 1999- High surf from Hurricane Dennis paralleling the east coast of Florida caused four fatalities.
- September 15, 1999- Once predicted to make a landfall on the state as a major hurricane, Hurricane Floyd paralleled the eastern coastline about 115 miles (185 km) offshore. At least 330 homes were damaged by fallen trees, and rough surf resulted in heavy beach erosion. Monetary damage totaled $61 million (1999 USD, $79 million 2008 USD).
- September 21, 1999- Tropical Storm Harvey struck Everglades City with a storm surge of over 2 feet (0.61 m). The storm dropped over 10 inches (250 mm) of rain, flooding several homes. Damage from Harvey totaled $15 million (1999 USD, $19 million 2008 USD).
- October 15, 1999- Hurricane Irene made landfall on Key West and later Cape Sable, producing heavy rainfall peaking at 17.45 inches (443 mm) in Boynton Beach. The rainfall led to flooding which isolated thousands. Five people were electrocuted from the floodwaters, and three people drowned when driving into flooded canals. Damage in the state amounted to $800 million (1999 USD).

== Monthly statistics ==
Number of recorded storms affecting Florida
Month	Number of storms
May	3
June	11
July	8
August	17
September	21
October	14
November	8

== Deadly storms ==
The following is a list of hurricanes with known deaths in Florida between 1975 and 2026.

Name	Year	Number of deaths
Andrew	1992	15
Gordon	1994	8
David	1979	5
Dennis	1999	4
Unnamed	1982	3
Kate	1985	3
Erin	1995	3
Eloise	1975	4 (FL)/ 80 (total)
Unnamed	1992	2
Bertha	1996	2 (1 indirect)
Earl	1998	2
Mitch	1998	2
Frederic	1979	1
Isidore	1984	1
Opal	1995	1
Irene	1999	0 (8 indirect)
