= Timeline of the 1992 Atlantic hurricane season =

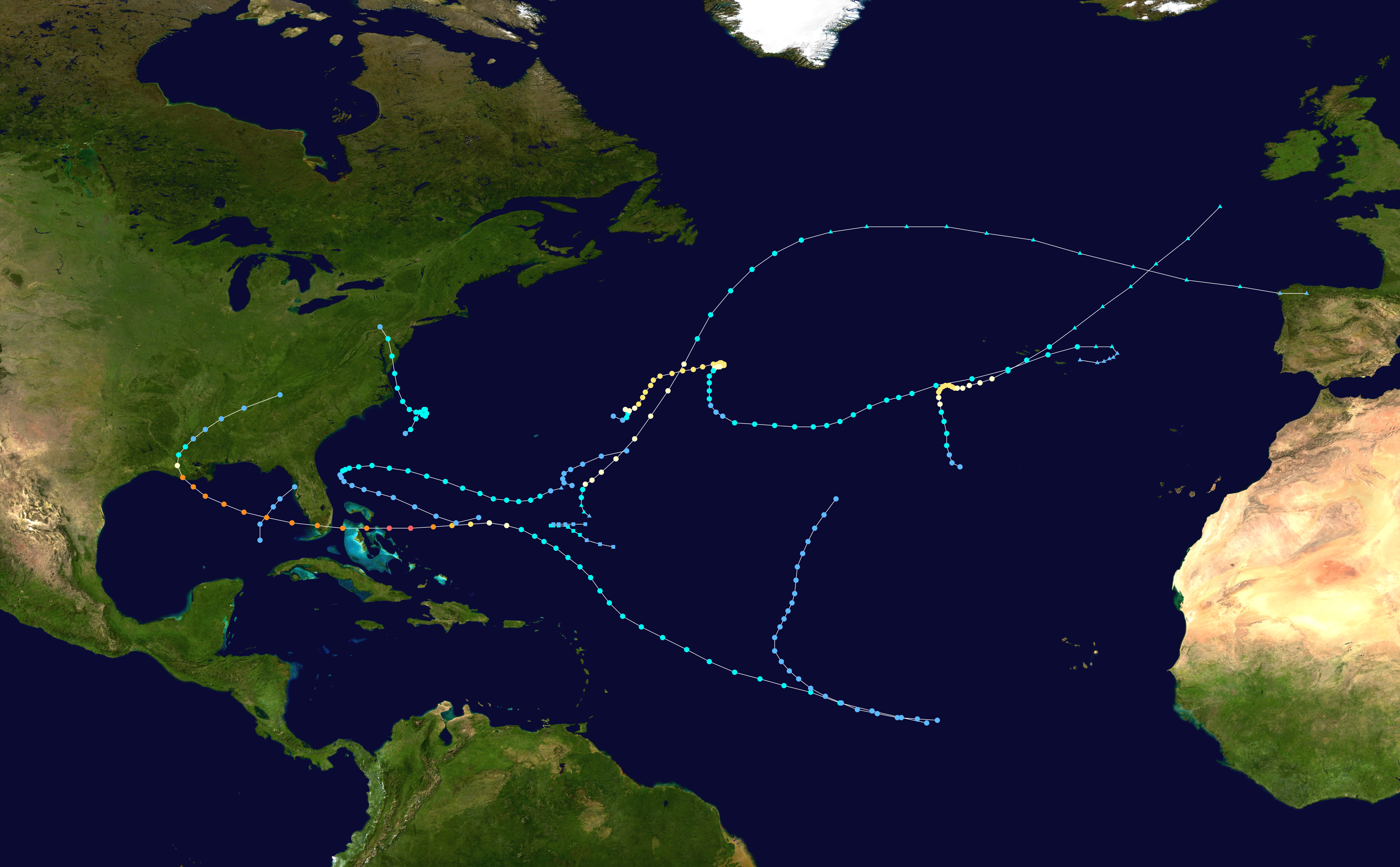
- Season summary map

Season boundaries
- First system formed: April 21, 1992
- Last system dissipated: October 27, 1992

Strongest system
- Name: Andrew
- Maximum winds: 175 mph (280 km/h) (1-minute sustained)
- Lowest pressure: 922 mbar (hPa; 27.23 inHg)

Longest lasting system
- Name: Bonnie
- Duration: 13.25 days
Storm articles
- Tropical Depression One (1992)
- Hurricane Andrew
- Tropical Storm Danielle (1992)

The 1992 Atlantic hurricane season was among the least active of any Atlantic hurricane season on record. It produced six named tropical cyclones. The season officially started on June 1, 1992, and ended on November 30. These dates, adopted by convention, historically delimit the period each year when most Atlantic tropical systems form. However, storm formation is possible at any time of the year, as was the case this season, when Subtropical Storm One formed on April 21. This timeline documents all the storm formations, strengthening, weakening, landfalls, extratropical transitions, as well as dissipations during the season.

During the year, three tropical depressions, one subtropical storm, two tropical storms, and four hurricanes formed. It produced seven storms, less than the average of ten usually formed throughout an Atlantic hurricane season, while four of the storms went on to become hurricanes. The first cyclone to form inside the official season was Tropical Depression One, which formed on June 25. Of the four hurricanes, Hurricane Andrew was the most intense, reaching category 5 status. In late June, Tropical Depression One caused severe flooding in southwestern Florida and Cuba; heavy rainfall was recorded in Pinar del Río, Matanzas, and Havana. When Andrew struck Florida and Louisiana in August, it became the second-costliest hurricane to hit the United States. Damages were estimated to be about $26.5 billion and 68 people were killed. Tropical Storm Danielle made landfall at the Delmarva Peninsula on the Virginian coast on September 25, causing minimal flooding. There was one recorded death recorded due to Danielle; a ship east of New Jersey was sunk due to rough seas. The season finished on October 30 when Hurricane Frances became an extratropical gale before dissipating.

== Timeline ==
=== April ===
Subtropical Depression One moves into its storm phase

April 21

- 8 a.m. AST (1200 UTC) – Subtropical Depression One forms about 600 miles (965 km) southeast of Bermuda (30 mph, 50 km/h). (Note: The figures for maximum sustained winds and position estimates are rounded to the nearest 5 units (knots, miles, or kilometers), following the convention used in the National Hurricane Center's operational products for each storm. All other units are rounded to the nearest digit.)

April 22

- 2 a.m. AST (0600 UTC) – Subtropical Depression One strengthens into a Subtropical Storm (50 mph, 80 km/h).

April 23

- 2 p.m. AST (1800 UTC) – Subtropical Storm One weakens back into a Subtropical Depression (35 mph, 55 km/h).

April 24

- 8 p.m. AST (0000 UTC April 25) – Subtropical Storm One dissipates.

=== June ===
June 1

- The 1992 Atlantic hurricane season officially begins.

June 25

- 6 a.m. CDT (1200 UTC) – Tropical Depression One forms 220 mi (355 km) northwest of Havana, Cuba (30 mph, 50 km/h).

June 26

- 1 p.m. EDT (1800 UTC) – Tropical Depression One dissipates over northern Florida.

=== July ===
July 24

- 5 p.m. AST (2100 UTC) – Tropical Depression Two forms 305 mi (490 km) southeast of Bermuda (30 mph, 50 km/h).

July 26

- 2 p.m. AST (1800 UTC) – Tropical Depression Two dissipates.

=== August ===
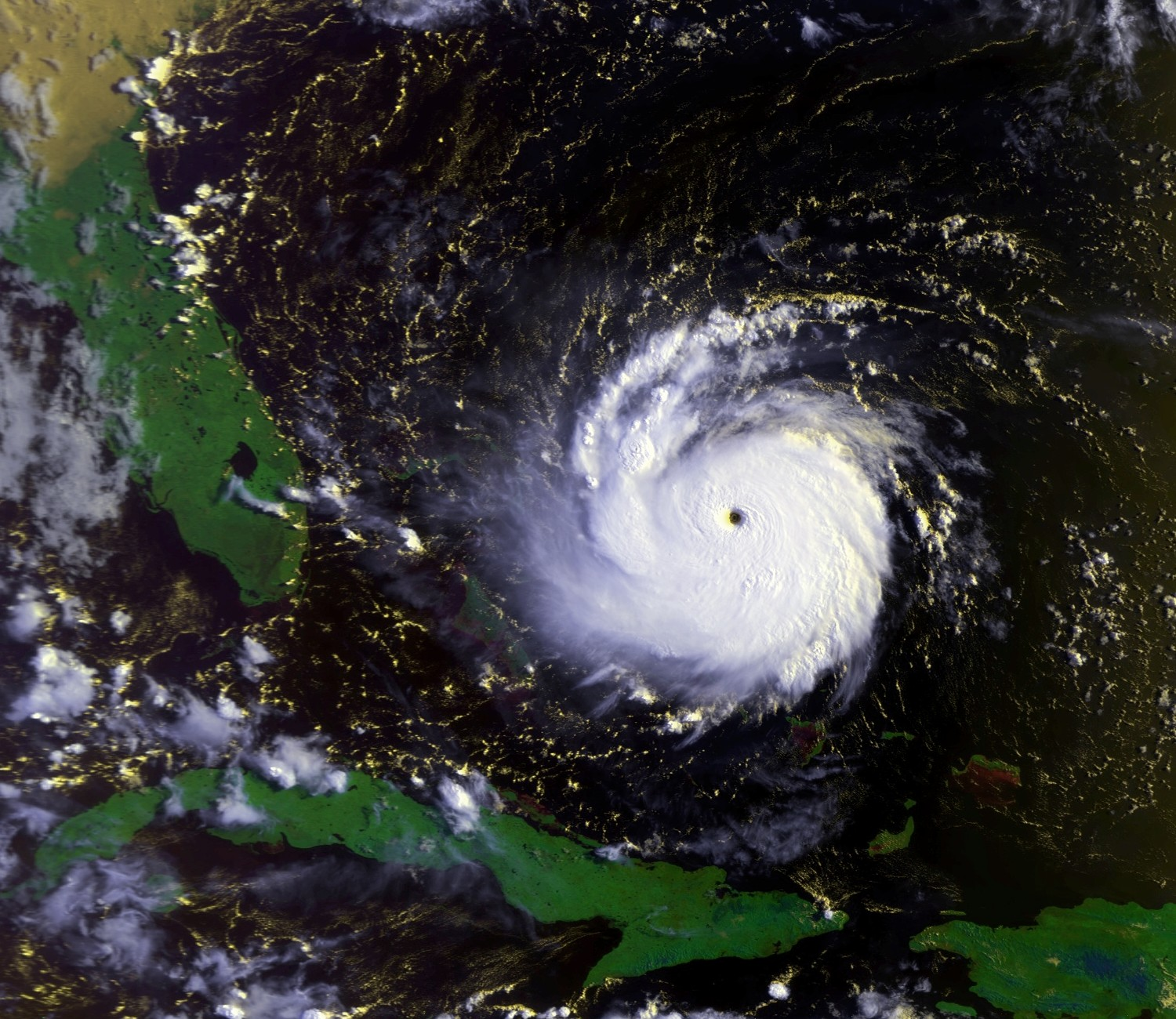
Hurricane Andrew reaching its highest intensity

August 16

- 4 p.m UTC-2 (1800 UTC) – Tropical Depression Three forms 775 mi (1,245 km) southwest of Brava, Cape Verde (30 mph, 50 km/h).

August 17

- 9 a.m. UTC-3 (1200 UTC) – Tropical Depression Three is upgraded to Tropical Storm Andrew (40 mph, 65 km/h).

August 22

- 7 a.m. EDT (1200 UTC) – Tropical Storm Andrew strengthens into Hurricane Andrew (80 mph, 130 km/h).
- 1 p.m. EDT (1800 UTC) – Hurricane Andrew becomes a Category 2 hurricane (110 mph, 175 km/h).
- 7 p.m. EDT (0000 UTC August 23) – Hurricane Andrew strengthens into a Category 3 hurricane (125 mph, 200 km/h).

August 23

- 1 a.m. EDT (0600 UTC) – Hurricane Andrew becomes a Category 4 hurricane (150 mph, 240 km/h).
- 7 a.m. EDT (1200 UTC) – Hurricane Andrew becomes a Category 5 hurricane (165 mph, 265 km/h).
- 1 p.m. EDT (1800 UTC) – Hurricane Andrew reaches its peak speed (175 mph, 280 km/h).
- 4 p.m. EDT (2100 UTC) – Hurricane Andrew makes landfall at Eleuthera Island, Bahamas (160 mph, 255 km/h).
- 7 p.m. EDT (0000 UTC August 24) – Hurricane Andrew weakens into a Category 4 hurricane (145 mph, 235 km/h).
- 8 p.m. EDT (0100 UTC August 24) – Hurricane Andrew makes landfall at Berry Islands, Bahamas (150 mph, 240 km/h).

August 24

- 3:40 a.m. EDT (0840 UTC) – Hurricane Andrew makes landfall at Elliott Key, Florida (165 mph, 265 km/h).
- 4:05 a.m. EDT (0905 UTC) – Hurricane Andrew makes landfall at Fender Point, Florida (165 mph, 265 km/h).

August 26

- 2:30 a.m. CDT (0830 UTC) – Hurricane Andrew makes landfall at Point Chevreuil, Louisiana (115 mph, 185 km/h).
- 6 a.m. CDT (1200 UTC) – Hurricane Andrew downgrades into a Category 1 hurricane (90 mph, 145 km/h).
- 12 a.m. CDT (1800 UTC) – Hurricane Andrew is downgraded into a tropical storm (60 mph, 95 km/h).
- 12 p.m. CDT (0600 UTC August 27) – Tropical Storm Andrew is downgraded again into a tropical depression (35 mph, 55 km/h).

August 28

- 7 a.m. EDT (1200 UTC) – Tropical Depression Andrew merges into a frontal system.

=== September ===
September 17

- 2 p.m. AST (1800 UTC) – Tropical Depression Four forms 345 mi (555 km) east-northeast of Bermuda (35 mph, 55 km/h).

September 18

- 2 a.m. AST (0600 UTC) – Tropical Depression Four upgrades into Tropical Storm Bonnie (40 mph, 65 km/h).
- 2 p.m. AST (1800 UTC) – Tropical Storm Bonnie strengthens into Hurricane Bonnie (75 mph, 120 km/h).

September 19

Hurricane Bonnie as a Category 2 hurricane

- 8 a.m. AST (1200 UTC) – Hurricane Bonnie becomes a Category 2 hurricane (100 mph, 160 km/h).

September 21

- 4 p.m. UTC-2 (1800 UTC) – Tropical Depression Five forms around 630 miles (1,020 km) southwest of the Azores (30 mph, 50 km/h).

September 22

- 7 a.m. EDT (1200 UTC) – Tropical Depression Six forms approximately 200 miles (325 km) south-southeast of Cape Hatteras, North Carolina (35 mph, 55 km/h).
- 10 a.m. UTC-2 (1200 UTC) – Tropical Depression Five becomes Tropical Storm Charley (40 mph, 65 km/h).
- 1 p.m. EDT (1800 UTC) – Tropical Depression Six becomes Tropical Storm Danielle (50 mph, 80 km/h).

September 23

- 10 a.m. UTC-2 (1200 UTC) – Tropical Storm Charley strengthens into Hurricane Charley (75 mph, 120 km/h).
- 3 p.m. UTC-3 (1800 UTC) – Hurricane Bonnie weakens into a Category 1 hurricane (90 mph, 145 km/h).
- 10 p.m. UTC-2 (0000 UTC September 24) – Hurricane Charley becomes a Category 2 hurricane (100 mph, 160 km/h).

September 24

- 3 p.m. UTC-3 (1800 UTC) – Hurricane Bonnie downgrades into Tropical Storm Bonnie (70 mph, 115 km/h).

September 25

- 10 a.m. UTC-2 (1200 UTC) – Tropical Depression Seven forms 775 miles (1,250 km) southwest of the Cape Verde Islands (30 mph, 50 km/h).
- 4 p.m. UTC-2 (1800 UTC) – Hurricane Charley weakens into a Category 1 hurricane (85 mph, 135 km/h).
- 5 p.m. EDT (2200 UTC) – Tropical Storm Danielle makes landfall at the Virginian coast on the Delmarva Peninsula (65 mph, 105 km/h).
- 9 p.m. UTC-3 (0000 UTC September 25) – Tropical Storm Bonnie weakens further to become Tropical Depression Bonnie (35 mph, 55 km/h).

September 26

- 7 a.m. EDT (1200 UTC) – Tropical Storm Danielle dissipates over western Pennsylvania after downgrading to Tropical Depression Danielle.
- 1 p.m. EDT (1800 UTC) – Tropical Depression Eight forms around 415 miles (665 km) north of Hispaniola (30 mph, 50 km/h).
- 3 p.m. UTC-3 (1800 UTC) – Tropical Depression Bonnie re-upgrades into Tropical Storm Bonnie (40 mph, 65 km/h).
- 11 p.m. UTC-1 (0000 UTC) – Hurricane Charley weakens into Tropical Storm Charley (70 mph, 115 km/h).

September 27

- 4 p.m. UTC-2 (1800 UTC) – Tropical Storm Charley becomes extratropical (60 mph, 95 km/h).

September 29

- 0600 UTC – Extratropical Storm Charley becomes absorbed by a larger extratropical storm northwest of the United Kingdom.
- 7 a.m. EDT (1200 UTC) – Tropical Depression Eight strengthens into Tropical Storm Earl (40 mph, 65 km/h).

September 30

- 11 p.m. UTC-1 (0000 UTC October 1) – Tropical Depression Bonnie becomes extratropical.

=== October ===
Tropical Storm Earl nearing landfall

October 1

- 2 p.m. AST (1800 UTC) – Tropical Depression Seven dissipates 1,125 miles (1,805 km) southwest of the Azores.

October 2

- 5 p.m. UTC-1 (1800 UTC) – Extratropical Storm Bonnie dissipates near the Azores.

October 3

- 8 a.m. AST (1200 UTC) – Tropical Storm Earl weakens into Tropical Depression Earl (35 mph, 55 km/h).
- 2 p.m. AST (1800 UTC) – Tropical Depression Earl becomes extratropical.

October 22

- 8 a.m. AST (1200 UTC) – An Extratropical Low forms 475 mi (765 km) southeast of Bermuda (35 mph, 55 km/h).

October 23

- 2 a.m. AST (0600 UTC) – Extratropical Low becomes Tropical Storm Frances (65 mph, 105 km/h).
- 2 p.m. AST (1800 UTC) – Tropical Storm Frances strengthens into Hurricane Frances (75 mph, 120 km/h).

October 25

- 2 p.m. AST (1800 UTC) – Hurricane Frances weakens into Tropical Storm Frances (70 mph, 115 km/h).

October 27

- 3 a.m. UTC-3 (0600 UTC) – Tropical Storm Frances becomes extratropical (60 mph, 95 km/h).

October 30

- 1 a.m. CET (0000 UTC) – Tropical Storm Frances dissipates after becoming an extratropical gale.

=== November ===
November 30

- The 1992 Atlantic hurricane season officially ends.

== See also ==
- 1992 Pacific hurricane season
- Tropical cyclones in 1992
