= 1992 hurricane season =

1992 hurricane season may refer to:

- The 1992 Atlantic hurricane season
- The 1992 Pacific hurricane season
