= Tropical Storm Danielle (1992) =

Atlantic tropical storm in 1992

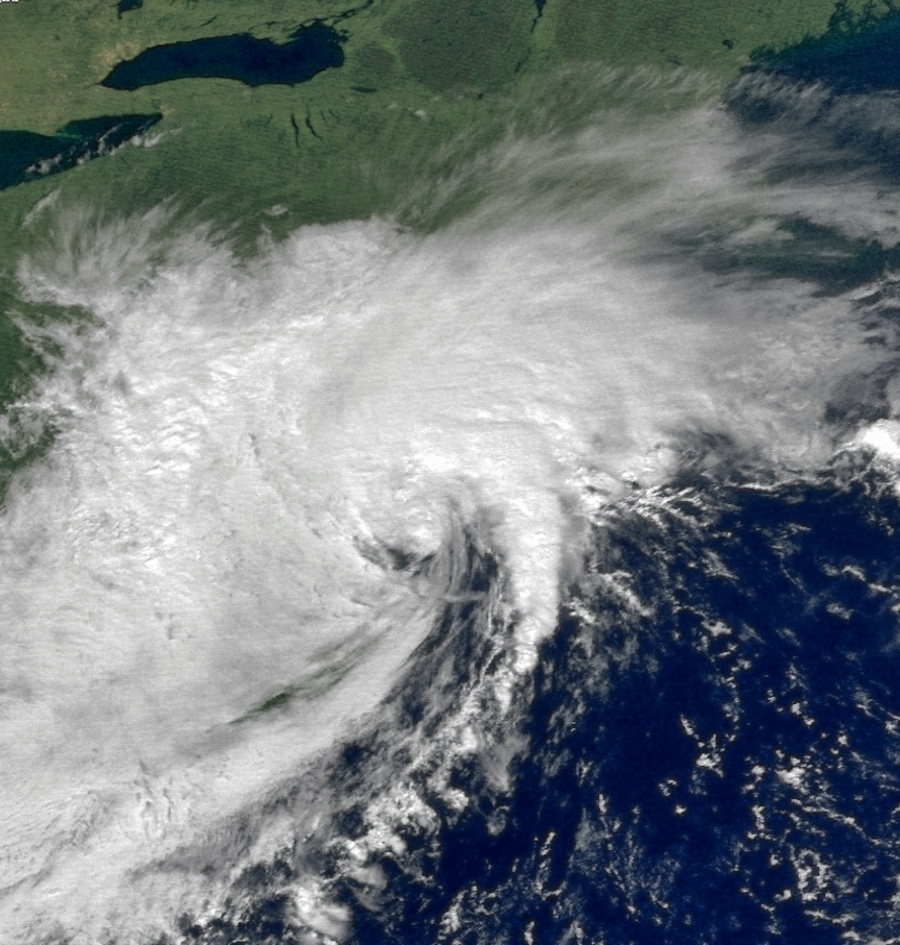
- Tropical Storm Danielle off the coast of North Carolina on September 25

Meteorological history
- Formed: September 22, 1992
- Dissipated: September 26, 1992

Tropical storm
- 1-minute sustained (SSHWS/NWS)
- Highest winds: 65 mph (100 km/h)
- Lowest pressure: 1001 mbar (hPa); 29.56 inHg

Overall effects
- Fatalities: 2 direct
- Areas affected: North Carolina, Virginia, Maryland, Delaware, New Jersey, Pennsylvania
- IBTrACS
- Part of the 1992 Atlantic hurricane season

Tropical Storm Danielle was a strong tropical storm that made landfall on Virginia in the 1992 Atlantic hurricane season. The fourth storm of the season, Danielle was one of two tropical cyclones in the year to make landfall in the United States, the other being Hurricane Andrew. It formed out of a stationary trough of low pressure on September 18 near the coast of North Carolina. The system quickly reached tropical storm status, and Danielle looped to the west due to a change in steering currents. Tropical Storm Danielle reached a peak of 65 mph (105 km/h) winds before weakening and hitting the Delmarva Peninsula. The storm quickly dissipated over land.

The storm dropped light rainfall throughout its path, and winds were minimal. The combination of Danielle and a high pressure system produced higher than normal tides and strong waves, causing beach erosion and light coastal damage. The waves killed two in New Jersey from a boat sinking, and also destroyed three houses in the Outer Banks of North Carolina. Overall damage from the storm was minimal.

== Meteorological history ==
Map plotting the storm's track and intensity, according to the Saffir–Simpson scale Map key Saffir–Simpson scale Tropical depression (≤38 mph, ≤62 km/h) Tropical storm (39–73 mph, 63–118 km/h) Category 1 (74–95 mph, 119–153 km/h) Category 2 (96–110 mph, 154–177 km/h) Category 3 (111–129 mph, 178–208 km/h) Category 4 (130–156 mph, 209–251 km/h) Category 5 (≥157 mph, ≥252 km/h) Unknown Storm type Tropical cyclone Subtropical cyclone Extratropical cyclone, remnant low, tropical disturbance, or monsoon depression

A surface trough of low pressure with an area of convection persisted off the southeast coast of the United States on September 18. On the same day, a weak tropical wave which moved off the coast of Africa on September 8 approached the area. A cold front merged with the stationary area of disturbed weather on September 20, and on September 22 a circulation developed 200 miles (320 km) southeast of Cape Hatteras, North Carolina. Organization continued as outflow became better defined, and the system developed into Tropical Depression Six later that day. The depression rapidly organized and attained tropical storm status with winds of 50 mph (80 km/h) just six hours after forming, upon which it was named Danielle. In response to an approaching trough, Danielle initially moved to the northeast. However, the trough outran the system, and a developing high pressure system to its north resulted in Danielle executing a tight, anticyclonic loop on September 23 to the 24th. The storm strengthened as it turned to the northwest, and reached a peak of 65 mph (105 km/h) winds on September 25 while just off the northeastern coast of North Carolina. Danielle turned to the north-northwest, and made landfall on the Eastern Shore of Virginia late on the 25th. It rapidly weakened over land, and dissipated over eastern Pennsylvania on September 26.

== Preparations ==
On September 24, the NHC issued tropical storm warnings for the North Carolina coast, about 36 hours before the storm passed to the east of the state. The storm's continued northward motion was unexpected; as a result, tropical storm warnings were not issued for the Delmarva Peninsula until just 12 hours before the storm made landfall. Forecasters issued tropical storm warnings from Delaware through Watch Hill, Rhode Island, as a precaution. In North Carolina, ferry operations between Ocracoke and the mainland at Hyde County were closed. Officials canceled schools in Dare County, North Carolina. Several families voluntarily evacuated St. George's Island in southern St. Mary's County, Maryland. Oficials in Delaware recommended evacuations for low-level areas and beaches. As a precaution, officials set up two shelters in Kent County.

== Impact ==
The pressure gradient between Tropical Storm Danielle and a ridge of high pressure to its north produced moderately strong winds across eastern North Carolina, peaking at 58 mph (93 km/h) at Alligator River Bridge. Several other locations reported over tropical storm force winds. The pressure gradient also produced higher than normal waves along the coastline, with a maximum of 20 feet (6.1 m) at Duck. Waves and high tides from the storm caused flooding along the Pamlico Sound side of Ocracoke and southern Hatteras Island. High tides also resulted in overwash in Pea Island, forcing the closure of Highway 12 due to 12 inches (300 mm) of salt water. High tides from the storm also destroyed two houses in south Nags Head and one in Rodanthe, two of which were previously condemned after the 1991 Perfect Storm. Three other houses in the Outer Banks were threatened by the storm. Elsewhere in the Outer Banks, pedestrian ramps and steps to the beachfront were damaged.

In Virginia, Danielle produced peak wind gusts of 61 mph (98 km/h) at Cape Henry, though sustained winds remained below tropical storm strength. Rainfall in the state peaked at 4.09 inches (0.104 m) in Charlottesville. The storm also produced higher than usual tides, peaking at 4.42 feet (1.35 m) at the mouth of the Elizabeth River in Sewells Point, as well as strong waves along the Virginia coastline. The waves caused significant overwash, leaving parts of Norfolk under 2 feet (0.61 m) of water. Several homes, businesses, and cars were flooded. The waves also eroded beaches along the coast. In neighboring Maryland, Danielle produced 2 to 3 feet (0.61 to 0.91 m) above-normal tides in Ocean City, where wind gusts reached 53 mph (85 km/h), also in Ocean City. Waves from the storm caused minor to moderate beach erosion along the coastline, and the combination of waves and high tides caused street flooding. In Delaware, the storm dropped light precipitation, with a maximum amount of 3.75 inches (95 mm) in Smyrna. Wind gusts peaked at 66 mph (106 km/h) at Cape Henlopen. Danielle caused 2 to 3-foot (.6 to .9-m) higher than normal tides, along with strong waves. The combination of the two flooded some coastal houses and resulted in significant beach and dune erosion. The waves also sank four boats and washed away a dock near Slaughter Beach. Gusty winds caused power outages in New Castle County, while persistent rainfall caused sewer interruptions.

In New Jersey near Island Beach State Park, waves from the storm crashed a sailboat, killing two people, while the other two occupants swam to shore. Strong waves from the storm washed out miles of beaches along the coastline. In Ocean City, the waves passed over the boardwalk and into houses. Rainfall from Danielle spread as far inland as Pennsylvania and as far northeast as Maine.

== See also ==
- Other storms of the same name
- List of North Carolina hurricanes
- List of New Jersey hurricanes
- Timeline of the 1992 Atlantic hurricane season
- Tropical Storm Fay (2020)
