= Tropical Depression One (1992) =

Atlantic tropical depression in 1992

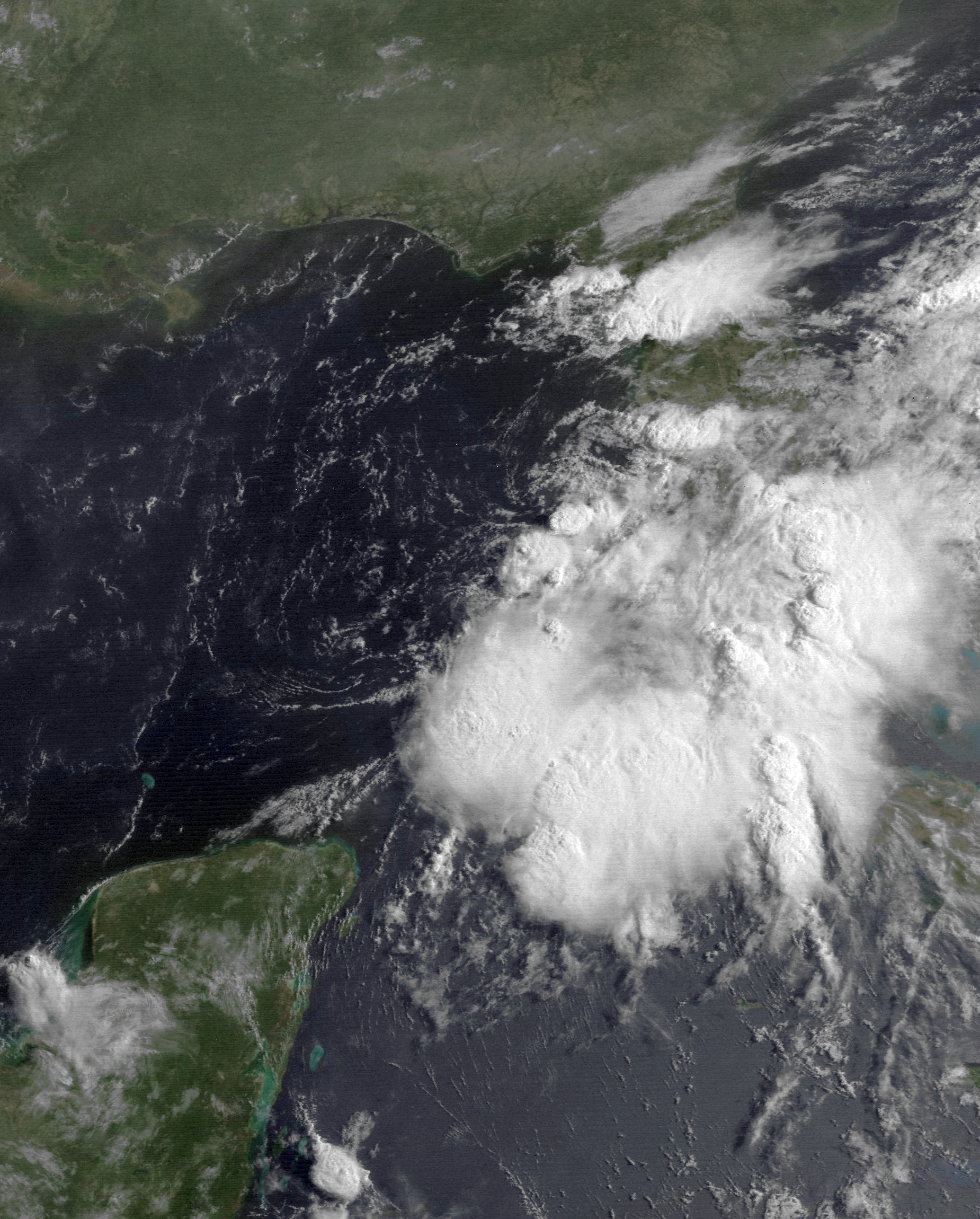
- Tropical Depression One in the eastern Gulf of Mexico on June 25

Meteorological history
- Formed: June 25, 1992
- Dissipated: June 26, 1992

Tropical depression
- 1-minute sustained (SSHWS/NWS)
- Highest winds: 35 mph (55 km/h)
- Lowest pressure: 1007 mbar (hPa); 29.74 inHg

Overall effects
- Fatalities: 4 direct, 1 indirect
- Missing: 1
- Damage: $2.6 million (1992 USD)
- Areas affected: Cuba, Florida
- IBTrACS
- Part of the 1992 Atlantic hurricane season

Tropical Depression One was a tropical depression that produced 100-year floods in portions of southwestern Florida. As the first tropical depression and second tropical cyclone of the 1992 Atlantic hurricane season, it developed on June 25 from a tropical wave. Located in an environment of strong wind shear, much of the convection in the system was located well to the southeast of the poorly defined center of circulation. The depression moved northeastward and made landfall near Tampa, Florida on June 26, shortly before dissipating over land.

The depression, in combination with an upper-level trough to its west, produced heavy rainfall to the east of its path. In Cuba, it peaked at 33.43 inches (849 mm), destroying hundreds of homes and causing two fatalities. In Florida, rainfall reached 25 inches (640 mm). The heaviest flooding occurred in Sarasota and Manatee counties, where 4,000 houses were affected, prompting thousands to evacuate. The flooding in Florida resulted in two direct fatalities and was indirectly responsible for an additional traffic casualty. Total damage in Florida amounted to over $2.6 million (1992 USD, $4 million 2009 USD).

== Meteorological history ==
Map plotting the storm's track and intensity, according to the Saffir–Simpson scale Map key Saffir–Simpson scale Tropical depression (≤38 mph, ≤62 km/h) Tropical storm (39–73 mph, 63–118 km/h) Category 1 (74–95 mph, 119–153 km/h) Category 2 (96–110 mph, 154–177 km/h) Category 3 (111–129 mph, 178–208 km/h) Category 4 (130–156 mph, 209–251 km/h) Category 5 (≥157 mph, ≥252 km/h) Unknown Storm type Tropical cyclone Subtropical cyclone Extratropical cyclone, remnant low, tropical disturbance, or monsoon depression

A weak tropical wave moved off the coast of Africa on June 12. It tracked westward across the tropical Atlantic Ocean with minimal convection, and subsequent to moving through the southern Windward Islands, it crossed northern Central America. Convection increased on June 20 as the wave entered the southwestern Caribbean. Under the influence of southeasterly flow from developing Hurricane Celia in the eastern Pacific Ocean and the south-southwesterly flow from a mid-to upper-level trough over the Gulf of Mexico, the area of disturbed weather tracked generally north-northwestward through the Caribbean Sea while spreading across Cuba and southern Florida.

On June 24, a mid-level circulation developed near the Yucatán Channel, and shortly thereafter satellite image loops indicated deep convection with some cyclonic rotation near the western tip of Cuba. A reconnaissance aircraft flight was dispatched late on June 24 into the system to determine if it developed into a tropical cyclone. The flight did not observe evidence of a closed low-level circulation. After the flight, satellite imagery indicated a low-level circulation was forming, and on June 25 ship and buoy data confirmed the system developed into Tropical Depression One while located about 235 miles (378 km) west-southwest of Key West, Florida. The National Hurricane Center (NHC) incorrectly classified the system as Tropical Depression Two due to an earlier subtropical storm.

Upon becoming a tropical cyclone, the depression was poorly organized, with much of the convection located well to the southeast of the broad center due to strong upper-level wind shear. The shearing environment was caused by a trough in the Gulf of Mexico and from the outflow from Pacific Hurricane Celia. This was reflected in forecasts, with the National Hurricane Center predicting no significant change in intensity or structure. The depression moved northward before turning to the northeast, and on June 26, the poorly organized system made landfall just north of Tampa. The low-level circulation dissipated while crossing the Florida peninsula, with the remnants continuing northeastward before being absorbed by a large extratropical cyclone over the western Atlantic.

== Impact ==
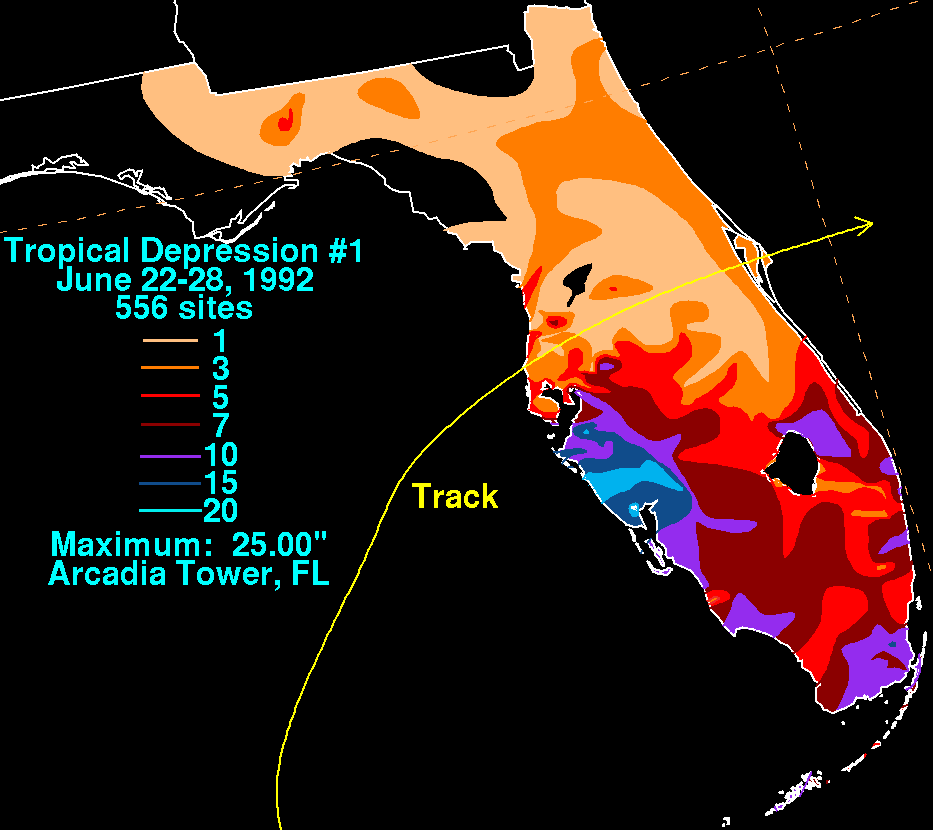
Rainfall summary for the tropical depression

The tropical depression, in combination with the upper-level trough to its west, produced torrential precipitation throughout Cuba, peaking at 33.43 inches (849 mm). This is the fifth-highest known rainfall total from a tropical cyclone in the country. The rainfall primarily affected the provinces of Pinar del Río, Matanzas, and Havana. Two Cuban citizens were killed by the rainfall, with an Arab student reported missing who presumably drowned. The deluge damaged or destroyed hundreds of houses in the provinces of Pinar del Río and Havana.

In Florida, the depression produced moderate winds near the coast, peaking at 51 miles per hour (82 km/h) in Naples. The system dropped torrential rainfall, peaking at 25 inches (640 mm) at Arcadia Tower. Large portions of the state reported totals in excess of 10 inches (250 mm) from the depression, with much of Sarasota County receiving over 20 inches (510 mm) of rain. The rainfall was classified as a 100-year flood event in Sarasota and Manatee counties. Officials in Manatee County declared a state of emergency in response to the flooding. About 3,000 people were forced to evacuate their homes due to the flooding, some of whom left by boat. The flooding damaged about 50 houses in and around Oneco. Due to the evacuations, no injuries were reported. The Lake Manatee reservoir in Manatee County rose to over 39 feet (12 m), 4 feet (1.2 m) above normal, which resulted in officials opening floodgates to mitigate potential flooding.

Tropical Depression One shortly before dissipating

In Sarasota County, the flooding closed several roads and led to many overflown creeks and rivers, including the Horse Creek, which crested at 5.8 feet (1.8 m) above flood level. The Myakka River crested at 11 feet (3.4 m) on the following Monday, 4 feet (1.2 m) above its flood stage. Damage to roads and bridges totaled about $1 million. Due to the flat landscape of the region, the flooding persisted for several days. The depression spawned a tornado in a mobile home park in Nokomis, destroying the roofs of five homes and causing leaks in twelve others. Throughout the area, the passage of the depression left about 45,000 customers without power, primarily due to gusty winds. The outages were fairly short-lived due to power companies calling in extra workers to restore the power. Moderate winds toppled a construction crane at the northern end of the Sunshine Skyway Bridge, closing the bridge for 35 minutes before the crane was removed. In Pinellas County, a man hydroplaned while driving along a flooded roadway; he crashed into a concrete pole and was killed. Severe crop damage to orange trees was reported in association with the flooding. Damage from the depression totaled over $2.6 million (1992 USD, $4 million 2008 USD), with about 4,000 houses affected by the flooding and an additional 70 destroyed. Two people were killed in Florida.

On August 14, about six weeks after the flooding, President George H. W. Bush declared a major disaster area for Charlotte, DeSoto, Manatee, and Sarasota counties. The declaration allowed for the use of federal funding to assist in the aftermath of the system.

== See also ==
- List of wettest tropical cyclones in Cuba since 1963
- List of Florida hurricanes
- Hurricane Andrew (1992) - Would affect Florida two months later, causing catastrophic damage.
