= 1992 Atlantic hurricane season =

- Season summary map

Seasonal boundaries
- First system formed: April 21, 1992
- Last system dissipated: October 27, 1992

Strongest storm
- Name: Andrew
  - Maximum winds: 175 mph (280 km/h) (1-minute sustained)
  - Lowest pressure: 922 mbar (hPa; 27.23 inHg)

Seasonal statistics
- Total depressions: 10
- Total storms: 7
- Hurricanes: 4
- Major hurricanes (Cat. 3+): 1
- ACE: 76
- Total fatalities: 73 total
- Total damage: $27.302 billion (1992 USD)

Related articles
- Timeline of the 1992 Atlantic hurricane season; 1992 Pacific hurricane season; 1992 Pacific typhoon season; 1992 North Indian Ocean cyclone season

The 1992 Atlantic hurricane season was a significantly below average season for overall tropical or subtropical cyclones as only ten formed; however, it became one of the most destructive hurricane seasons ever recorded at the time, mostly due to Hurricane Andrew. Six of them became named tropical storms, and four of those became hurricanes; one hurricane became a major hurricane (Category 3 to 5 strength on the Saffir–Simpson scale). The season was, however, near-average in terms of accumulated cyclone energy. The season officially started on June 1 and officially ended on November 30. However, tropical cyclogenesis is possible at any time of the year, as demonstrated by formation in April of an unnamed subtropical storm in the central Atlantic.

In June, Tropical Depression One caused flooding in Cuba and in Florida, where two people were killed. In August, Hurricane Andrew, the season's only major hurricane, struck the Bahamas, Florida, and Louisiana. It was the costliest Atlantic hurricane on record at the time, caused $27.3 billion (1992 USD) in damage; it also caused as 65 fatalities. Its greatest impact was in South Florida, where the storm made landfall with 1-minute sustained winds of 175 mph (280 km/h).

One month later, Hurricanes Bonnie and Charley produced tropical storm-force winds in the Azores, and the former caused one fatality. Tropical Storm Danielle was one of few tropical cyclones known to make landfall on the Delmarva Peninsula. The storm caused minor damage and two fatalities in the Mid-Atlantic and New England regions of the United States. One other hurricane in the season, Frances, did not significantly affect land. It developed in the central Atlantic, and tracked well away from land, and brought only light rainfall to Newfoundland. Collectively, the storms in the 1992 Atlantic hurricane season caused $27.3 billion in losses and 73 fatalities.

== Seasonal forecasts ==
Predictions of tropical activity in the 1992 season
Source	Date	Named storms	Hurricanes	Major hurricanes	Ref
Record high activity		30	15	7 (Tie)
Record low activity		1	0 (tie)	0
CSU	December 1991	8	4	1
WRC	Early 1992	6	3	N/A
CSU	April 1992	8	4	1
CSU	June 1992	8	4	1
CSU	August 1992	8	4	1
Actual activity		7	4	1

Forecasts of hurricane activity are issued before each hurricane season by Dr. William M. Gray and his associates at Colorado State University (CSU) and the Weather Research Center (WRC). A normal season as defined by the National Oceanic and Atmospheric Administration (NOAA) has 12.1 named storms, of which 6.4 reach hurricane strength, and 2.7 become major hurricanes. In December 1991, CSU issued its first forecast for the year and predicted that 1992 would see eight named storms, four hurricanes, and one major hurricane. CSU also issued a forecast in April, June and August; however, no revisions were made to the numbers of named storms, hurricanes, and major hurricane predicted in 1992. Prior to the season starting, the WRC predicted that the season would see six named storms, with three of those becoming a hurricane while no forecast was made on the numbers of major hurricanes.

== Season summary ==
The Atlantic hurricane season officially began on June 1, but activity in 1992 began more than a month earlier with the formation of Subtropical Storm One on April 21. It was a below average season in which 10 tropical or subtropical depressions formed. Seven of the depressions attained tropical storm status, and four of these attained hurricane status. In addition, one tropical cyclone eventually attained major hurricane status, which is below the 1981–2010 average of 2.7 per season. The low amount of activity is partially attributed to weaker than normal tropical waves, the source for most North Atlantic tropical cyclones. Only two hurricanes and one tropical storm made landfall during the season. However, damage from Hurricane Andrew was exorbitant, causing most of the season's 73 deaths and $27.3 billion (1992 USD) damage toll.

Tropical cyclogenesis in the 1992 Atlantic hurricane season began with the development of Subtropical Storm One on April 21. However, over the next three months, minimal activity occurred, with only two depressions developing, one in June and the other in July. Although wind shear was relatively weak in August, only one tropical cyclone occurred in that month. However, that one tropical cyclone, Hurricane Andrew, was the strongest and costliest of the season. Though September is the climatological peak of hurricane season, an increase in wind shear prevented tropical cyclogenesis in the first half of the month. After September 16, however, five tropical cyclones developed in a span of nine days, from September 17 to 26. Thereafter, activity abruptly halted, and only one tropical cyclone developed in October, Hurricane Frances. By October 27, Frances became extratropical, ending season activity.

The season's activity was reflected with an accumulated cyclone energy (ACE) rating of 76, which is classified as "near normal". ACE is, broadly speaking, a measure of the power of the hurricane multiplied by the length of time it existed, so storms that last a long time, as well as particularly strong hurricanes, have high ACEs. It is only calculated for full advisories on tropical systems at or exceeding 39 mph (63 km/h), which is the threshold for tropical storm strength.

== Systems ==
=== Subtropical Storm One ===
- Subtropical storm (SSHWS)
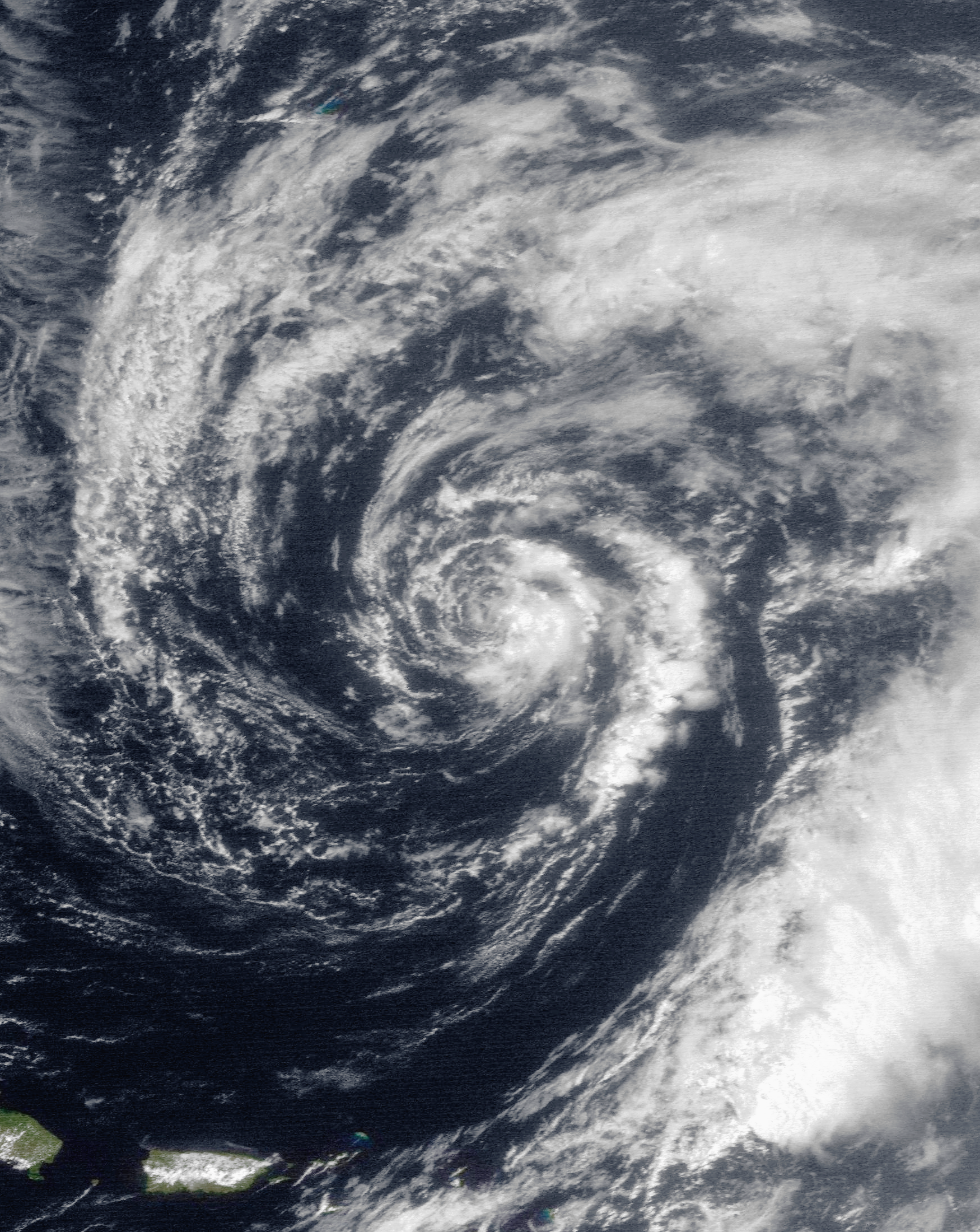
- Duration: April 21 – April 24
- Peak intensity: 50 mph (85 km/h) (1-min); 1002 mbar (hPa)

On April 21, a low-pressure area separated from the prevailing westerlies about 600 miles (970 km) southeast of Bermuda, and developed into a subtropical depression at 1200 UTC. The system maintained a large comma-shaped cloud pattern around the low-level circulation. Operationally, it was not classified until 27 hours later. Isolated from strong steering currents, the depression tracked northwestward at 12 mph (19 km/h), and intensified into a subtropical storm early on April 22. It gradually became better organized, with a large convective band in the eastern semicircle. Reports from a nearby ship indicated peak winds of 50 mph (80 km/h), with swells of 64.4 feet (19.6 m).

The National Hurricane Center remarked the potential for the system transitioning into a tropical cyclone. An approaching trough caused the storm to stall and weaken the deep convection. On April 23, the cyclone weakened to depression status due to strong wind shear. A hurricane hunter's flight into the system confirmed the weakening, and also reported a 1.8 °F (1 °C) temperature rise in the center, suggesting a warm core and some tropical characteristics. Early on April 24, the subtropical depression turned eastward, maintaining limited convection. At the time, forecasters anticipated the depression would continue east-northeastward and become an extratropical cyclone. By late on April 24, the system was too weak to classify using the Dvorak technique, and the NHC ceased issuing advisories. Within 24 hours, the circulation dissipated as the system continued eastward through the westerlies.

=== Tropical Depression One ===
- Tropical depression (SSHWS)
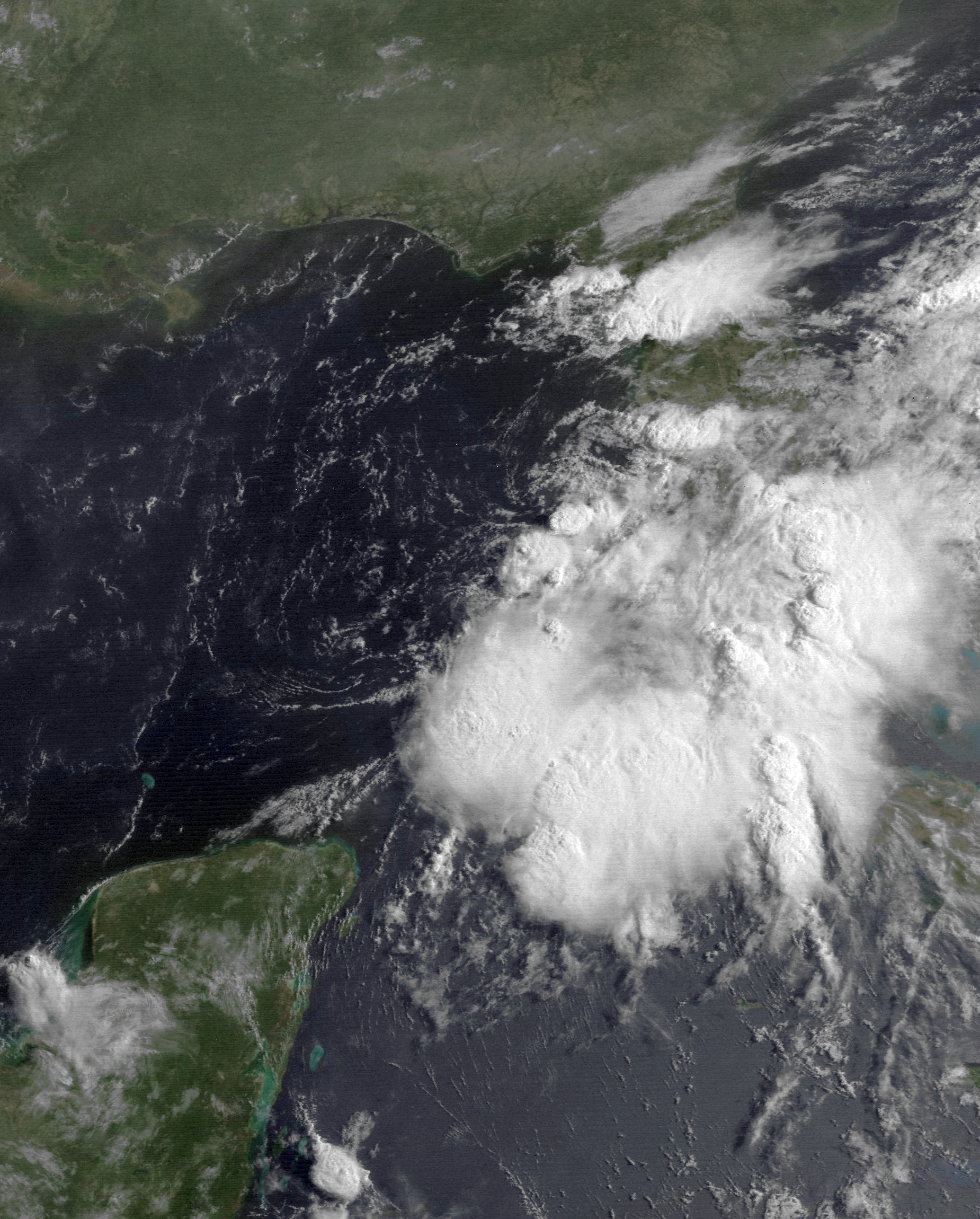
- Duration: June 25 – June 26
- Peak intensity: 35 mph (55 km/h) (1-min); 1007 mbar (hPa)

A tropical wave emerged off the western coast of Africa on June 12, and eventually developed into Tropical Depression One in the southeastern Gulf of Mexico. Operationally, the National Hurricane Center designated this system as Tropical Depression Two, which led to confusion because of Subtropical Storm One in April, and then another Tropical Depression Two in July. Outflow from Hurricane Celia in the Pacific Ocean and a trough in the Gulf of Mexico generated wind shear on the depression, which prevented it from intensifying into a tropical storm. The depression curved north-northeastward and eventually made landfall near Tampa, Florida, on June 26 around 1500 UTC. As it was moving ashore, the National Hurricane Center noted that the depression was too poorly organized to locate the center of circulation, and discontinued advisories on the system.

The depression dropped heavy rainfall in Cuba, peaking at 33.43 inches (849 mm). Large amounts of precipitation resulted in flooding, which damaged or destroyed hundreds of homes and caused two fatalities in provinces of Pinar del Río and La Habana. As the system was only a tropical depression, light winds were reported; however, a peak gust of 56 mph (90 km/h) was reported at MacDill Air Force Base. Heavy rainfall fell on the west coast of Florida, with local amounts exceeded 20 inches (510 mm). Precipitation throughout the state peaked at 25 inches (640 mm) in Arcadia Tower. Heavy rainfall caused flooding in portions of Florida, which in turn, destroyed 70 houses. In addition, five homes destroyed and twelve were damaged by a tornado spawned in Nokomis. Severe crop damage to orange trees was also reported. The depression caused two fatalities in Florida and damage totaled to $2.6 million (1992 USD).

=== Tropical Depression Two ===
- Tropical depression (SSHWS)
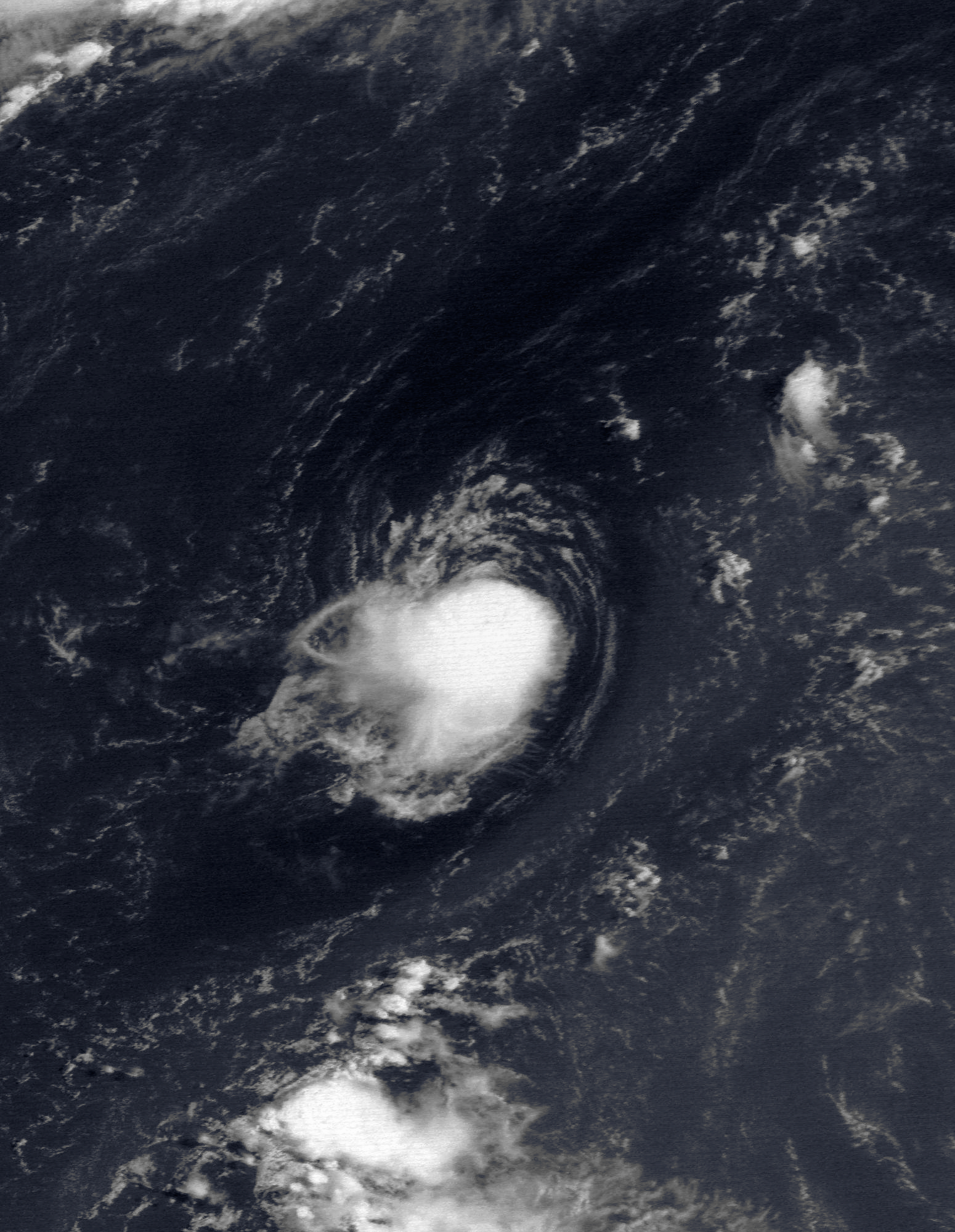
- Duration: July 24 – July 26
- Peak intensity: 35 mph (55 km/h) (1-min); 1015 mbar (hPa)

A squall line which moved offshore New York and southern New England formed a mesoscale convective vortex, which fired new thunderstorm activity each day as it moved within the westerlies across the northern Atlantic. Once it reached mid-ocean, an increasingly northerly steering flow dropped the system down into the subtropics to the east of Bermuda, and it maintained decent organization. By 2100 UTC on July 24, the National Hurricane Center began classifying the system as Tropical Depression Two. In the first advisory on the depression, it was noted that the previous tropical depression was erroneously classified as Tropical Depression Two.

Due to northeasterly wind shear, the depression failed to intensified or organize further, as predicted. Instead, the depression weakened by late on July 25, with satellite imagery indicating that much of the deep convection was removed from the surface circulation. By July 26, the National Hurricane Center issued its final advisory, noting that it was "too weak to classify and is rapidly losing its identity". The depression dissipated about three hours later.

=== Hurricane Andrew ===
- Category 5 hurricane (SSHWS)
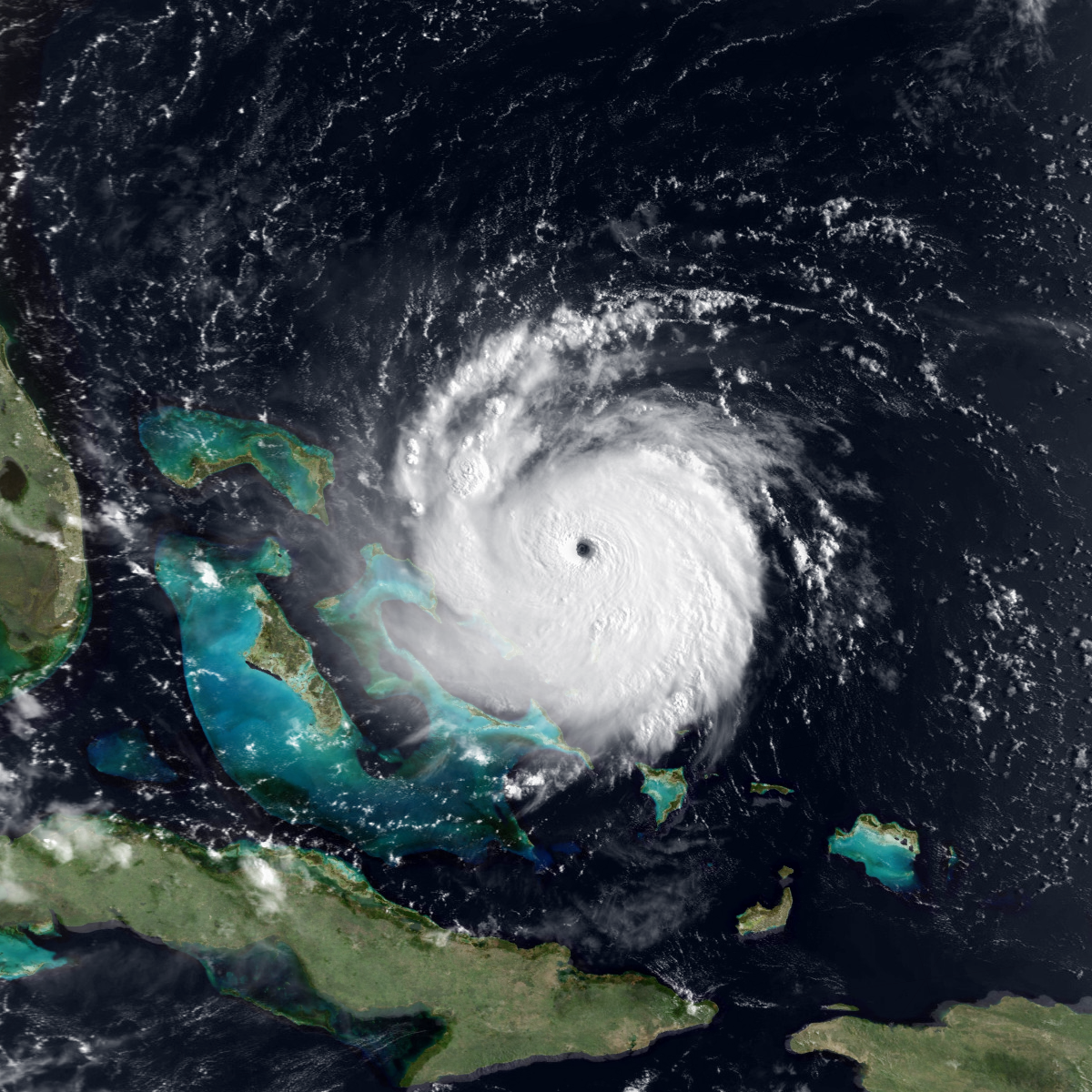
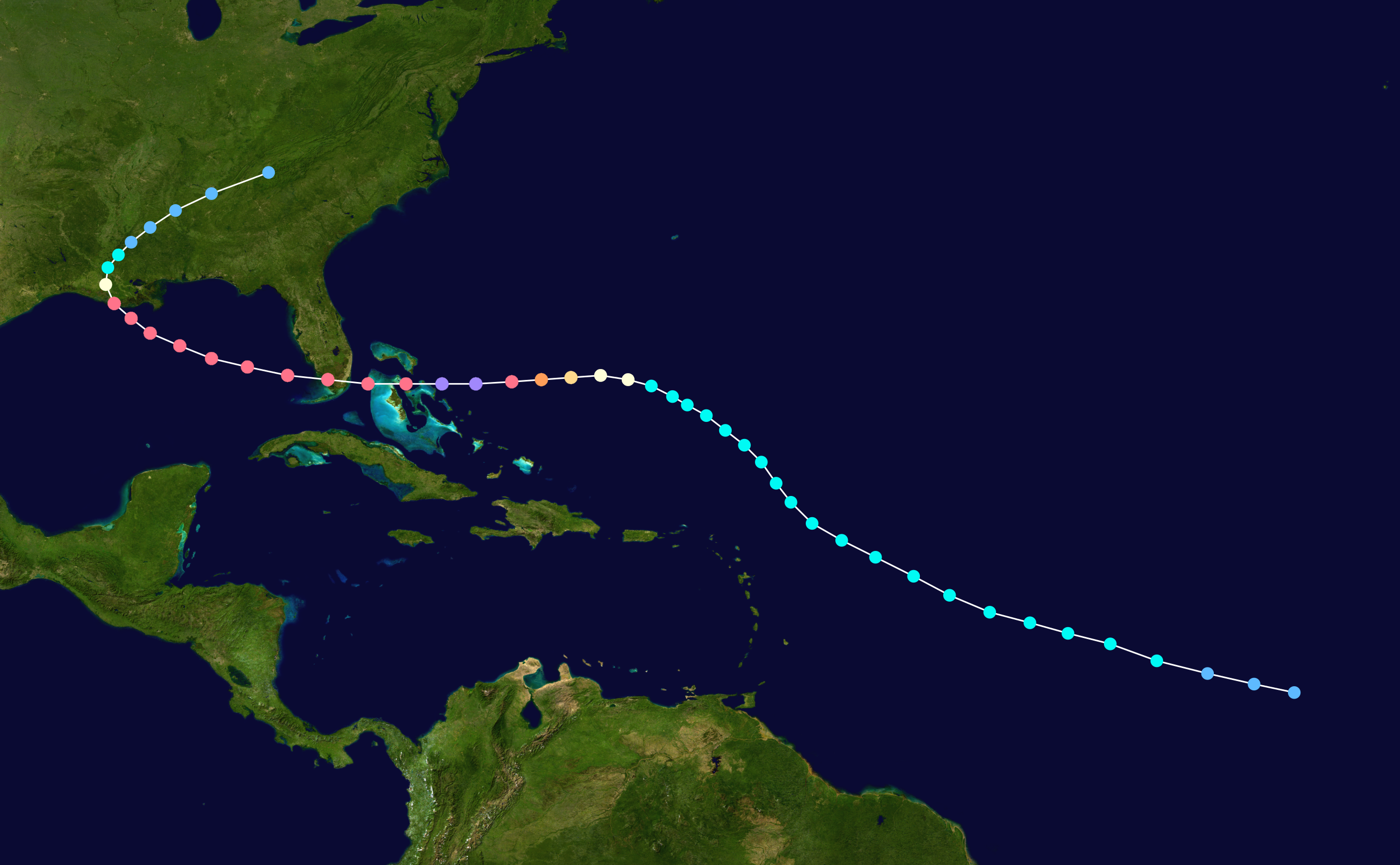
- Duration: August 16 – August 28
- Peak intensity: 175 mph (280 km/h) (1-min); 922 mbar (hPa)

A tropical wave moved off the coast of Africa on August 14, and organized into Tropical Depression Three on August 16 while located about halfway between the Windward Islands and the coast of Africa. It moved to the west-northwest, and strengthened into Tropical Storm Andrew on August 17. After reaching winds of 50 mph (80 km/h), strong southwesterly shear weakened the storm, and by August 20 it weakened to a minimal storm with a pressure of 1,015 mbar (30.0 inHg). It bypassed the Lesser Antilles completely, and turned to the west in response to a building high pressure system to the north. Upon turning to the west, a trough of low pressure positioned to the southwest of Andrew created an environment with little vertical shear and well-defined outflow. The storm quickly intensified due to its small size, and became a hurricane on August 22. Andrew rapidly intensified under ideal conditions for development, and on August 23 the hurricane peaked with winds of 175 mph (282 km/h). It crossed the Bahamas at that intensity, weakened slightly, and re-intensified to a 165 mph (266 km/h) Category 5 hurricane before making landfall near Homestead, Florida. It weakened slightly over the state to a 135 mph (217 km/h) hurricane, but restrengthened to a 145 mph (233 km/h) hurricane over the Gulf of Mexico. A strong mid-latitude trough turned Andrew northward, where it greatly weakened before hitting west of Morgan City, Louisiana on August 26 as a 115 mph (185 km/h) Category 3 hurricane. It turned northeastward, and lost its tropical identity over Tennessee on August 28, before merging with the remnants of Hurricane Lester and another frontal system over Pennsylvania on August 29.

In the Bahamas, Andrew brought high tides, hurricane-force winds, and tornadoes, which caused significant damage in the archipelago, especially on Cat Cays. At least 800 houses were destroyed and left damage to the transport, communications, water, sanitation, agriculture, and fishing sectors. Overall, Andrew caused four fatalities and $250 million in damage in the Bahamas. Throughout the southern portions of Florida, Andrew brought very high winds; a wind gust of 177 mph (285 km/h) was reported at a house in Perrine, Florida. High winds caused catastrophic damage in Florida, especially in Miami-Dade County, where approximately 117,000 houses were either severely damaged or destroyed. In the Everglades, 70,000 acres (280 km^{2}) of trees were knocked down and about 182 million fish were killed. Rainfall in Florida was moderate, peaking at 13.98 inches (355 mm) in western Miami-Dade County. Significant damage to oil platforms was reported, with one company losing 13 platforms, had 104 structures damaged, and five drilling wells blown off course. In Louisiana, Andrew produced hurricane-force winds along its path, damaging 23,000 homes and destroying 985 homes and 1,951 mobile homes. An F3 tornado in St. John the Baptist Parish damaged or destroyed 163 structures. 17 fatalities were reported in Louisiana, six of which were drowning victims offshore. Elsewhere, the storm spawned at least 28 tornadoes, especially in Alabama, Georgia, and Mississippi. Overall, Andrew caused 65 fatalities and $27.3 billion (1992 USD) in damage, making it the ninth-costliest hurricane in U.S. history, behind Hurricane Katrina in 2005, Hurricane Ike in 2008, Hurricane Sandy in 2012, hurricanes Harvey, Irma, Maria in 2017, Hurricane Florence in 2018, Hurricane Ida in 2021, and Hurricane Ian in 2022

=== Hurricane Bonnie ===
- Category 2 hurricane (SSHWS)
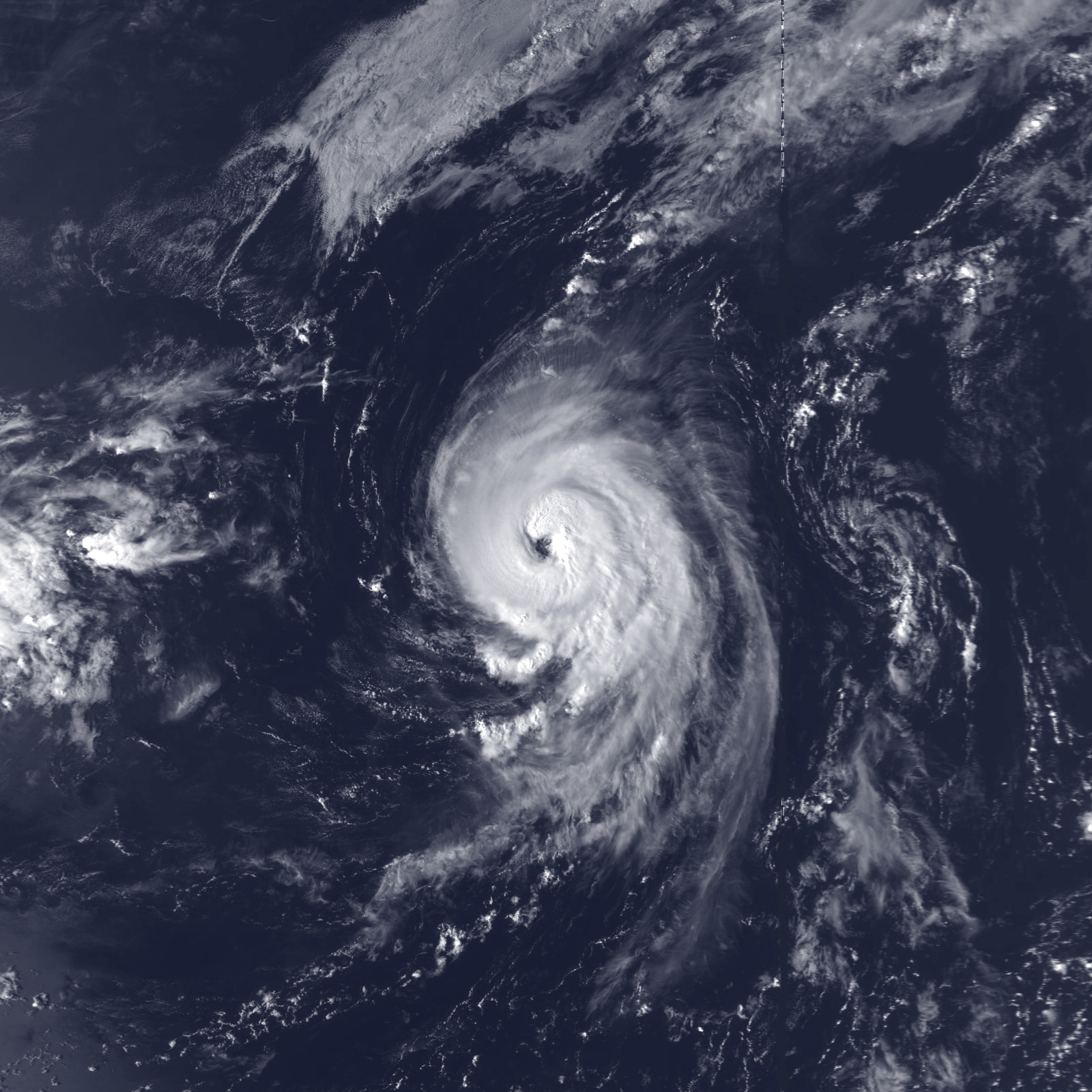
- Duration: September 17 – September 30
- Peak intensity: 110 mph (175 km/h) (1-min); 965 mbar (hPa)

On September 11, a cold front moved off the U.S. East Coast and cloud cover began to slowly detach itself from the front and form into a tropical low. On September 17, the system organized into a tropical depression. On September 18, it was upgraded to Tropical Storm Bonnie and began to move slowly northeast. Low wind shear allowed Bonnie to quickly strengthen into a Category 2 hurricane before weakening slightly. On September 21, Bonnie restrengthened slightly and reached its peak intensity of 110 mph (175 km/h) sustained winds and a central pressure of 965 mbar. The next day, Bonnie began gradually weakening while turning eastward before reaching a ridge of high pressure, stalling its motion. Convection began to diminish, and on September 24, Bonnie was downgraded to a tropical storm. On September 25, Bonnie was downgraded to a tropical depression. The weakening trend ended on September 26 and Bonnie regained tropical storm status. Bonnie then turned southeast while strengthening. Bonnie was operationally declared extratropical on September 27 as it turned northeast until September 28. The storm then entered an environment with greater wind shear while accelerating northeast. The storm crossed over the Azores on September 30 with 65 mph (100 km/h) winds. Bonnie was then declared extratropical. The extratropical low drifted southwest in a clockwise loop, approaching the Azores again and dissipated October 2. In the Azores, the Lajes Air Base reported sustained winds of 40 mph (64 km/h) with gusts to 59 mph (94 km/h). In São Miguel, a man was killed by a rock fall.

=== Hurricane Charley ===
- Category 2 hurricane (SSHWS)
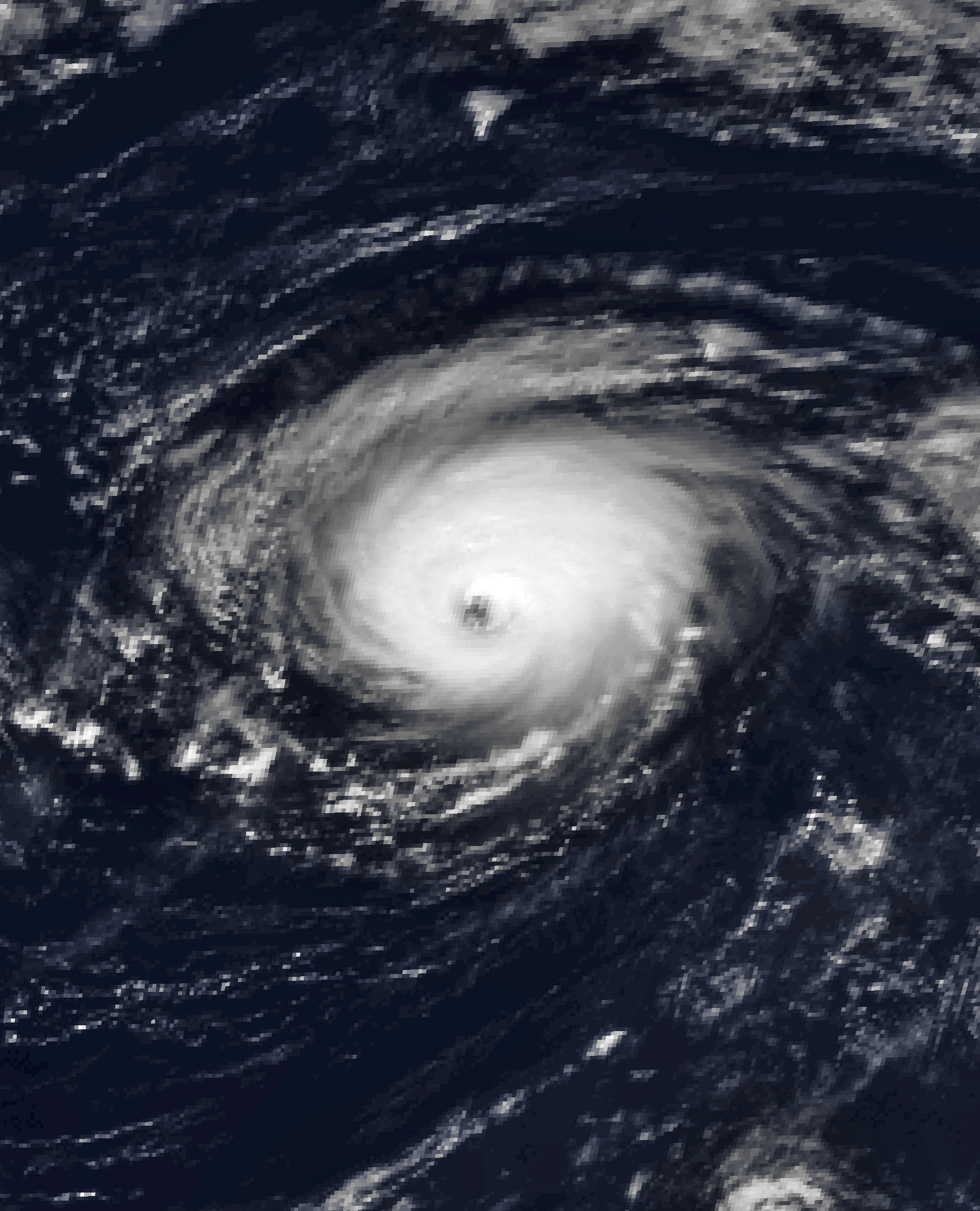
- Duration: September 21 – September 27
- Peak intensity: 110 mph (175 km/h) (1-min); 965 mbar (hPa)

On September 20, METEOSAT imagery indicated an area of convection becoming concentrated while well south of the Azores. It is possible that a mid to upper-level cyclonic circulation interacted with the northern portion of a tropical wave. By the following day, satellite imagery noted a well-defined low-level circulation and thus, Tropical Depression Five while centered about 633 miles (1,019 km) south of the Azores. The depression tracked northwestward and satellite imagery began to indicate banding features. As a result, the depression was upgraded to Tropical Storm Charley on September 22. An eye developed as Charley tracked north-northwestward, and it became a hurricane on September 23. Further strengthening occurred, and by late on September 24, Charley peaked as a 110 mph (180 km/h) Category 2 hurricane.

Thereafter, Charley turned eastward and then east-northeastward while tracking over decreasing sea surface temperatures (SST). Early on September 27, Charley was downgraded to a tropical storm. Later that day, Charley crossed over Terceira Island in the Azores with winds of 65 mph (105 km/h). Charley gradually lost tropical characteristics, and by 1800 UTC on September 27, it had transitioned into an extratropical storm. The remnant system accelerated northeastward toward the British Isles, where it merged with another extratropical low on September 29. While passing through the Azores, Charley produced tropical storm force winds, with the Lajes AFB reporting sustained winds of 53 mph (85 km/h) and gusts reaching 82 mph (132 km/h). No other effects from Charley were reported in the Azores.

=== Tropical Storm Danielle ===
- Tropical storm (SSHWS)
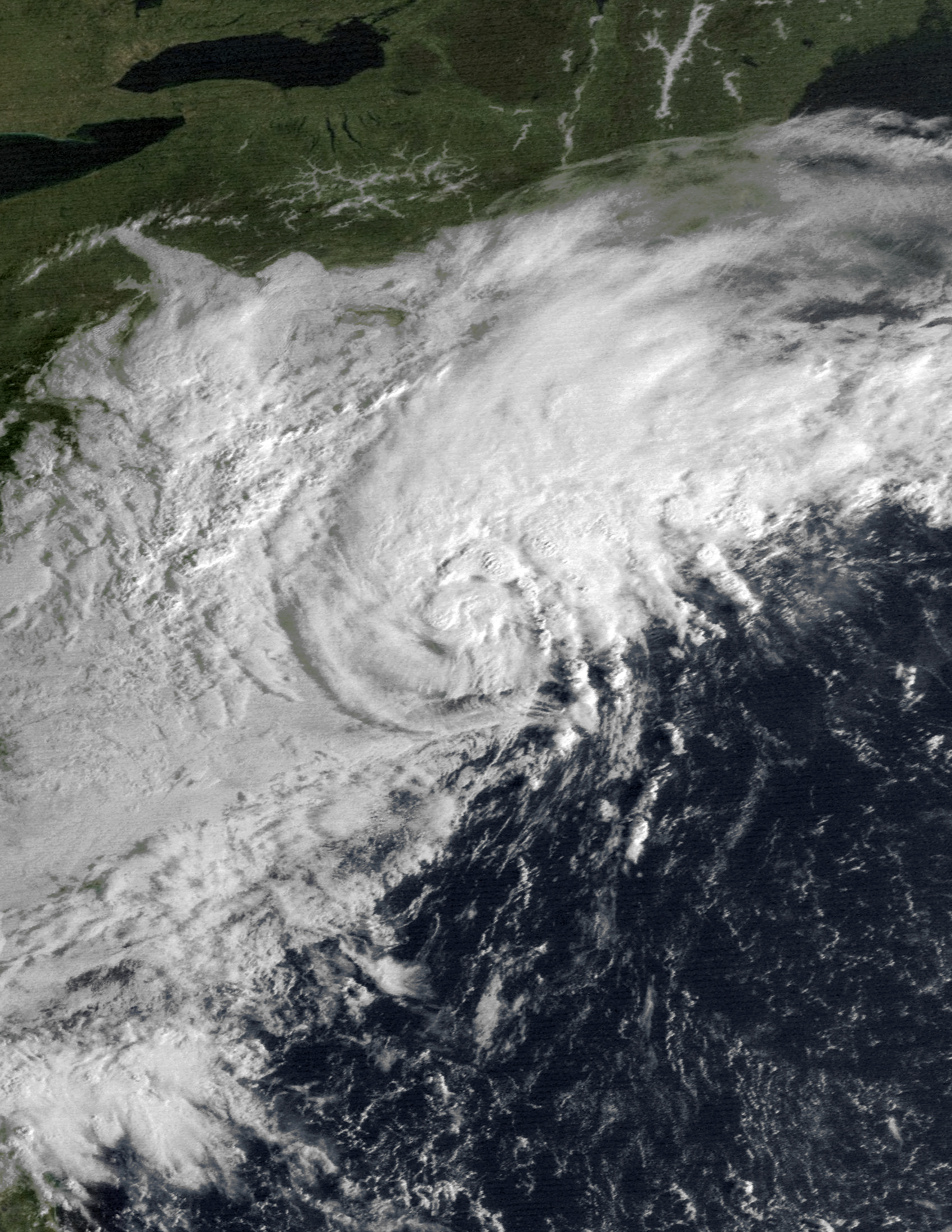
- Duration: September 22 – September 26
- Peak intensity: 65 mph (100 km/h) (1-min); 1001 mbar (hPa)

Tropical Depression Six developed offshore of the Southeastern United States on September 22 from the merger of a surface trough, a tropical wave, and a cold front. The depression quickly intensified and was upgraded to Tropical Storm Danielle six hours later. An approaching trough caused a northeastward movement, but later a high pressure system forced the storm to northwestward, which caused Danielle to execute a small anti-cyclonic loop on September 23–24. While offshore of North Carolina on September 25, Danielle reached its peak intensity as a moderately strong tropical storm with maximum sustained winds of 65 mph (105 km/h). It was initially predicted that Danielle would make landfall in North Carolina; however, the storm curved north-northwestward and made landfall in Maryland on the eastern shore of the Delmarva Peninsula at the same intensity. Danielle continued inland and weakened and dissipated over eastern Pennsylvania on September 26.

Danielle caused severe beach erosion in North Carolina, Virginia, and Maryland, which resulted in overwash, which in turn, damaged or destroyed several businesses and houses in the coastal portions of the three states. In addition, street flooding also closed several roads in the region, most notably, North Carolina Highway 12. Many states in the Mid-Atlantic and New England also reported rainfall, although rarely exceeding 3 inches (76 mm). In addition high seas offshore of New Jersey capsized a sailboat, causing two people to drown. Overall, damage from the storm was minimal, with the exception of the damaged or destroyed businesses and houses in North Carolina, Virginia, and Maryland.

=== Tropical Depression Seven ===
- Tropical depression (SSHWS)
- Duration: September 25 – October 1
- Peak intensity: 35 mph (55 km/h) (1-min); 1008 mbar (hPa)

A poorly organized tropical wave emerged off the west coast of Africa on September 23 and quickly developed into Tropical Depression Seven on September 25, while centered 775 miles (1,247 km) southwest of Cape Verde. Because the depression was tracking over warm SST, it was predicted to intensify into a tropical storm. However, wind shear exposed the center as indicated by visible satellite images on September 26, and the National Hurricane Center noted on September 26 that "the depression could be downgraded to a tropical wave later today". Early on September 27, the center of the depression became difficult to locate on satellite imagery.

By September 28, the organization of the depression deteriorated further due to strong vertical wind shear. The center of the depression again became difficult to location by infrared images early on September 29. Later that day, a few computer models indicated a decrease in wind shear over the depression within two days, thus, it was predicted to strengthen into a tropical storm. However, wind shear exposed the center of the depression again by early on September 30, though it was still forecast to intensify to tropical storm status. By late on October 1, satellite imagery noted that the depression dissipated, and the National Hurricane Center issued its final advisory on the system.

=== Tropical Storm Earl ===
- Tropical storm (SSHWS)
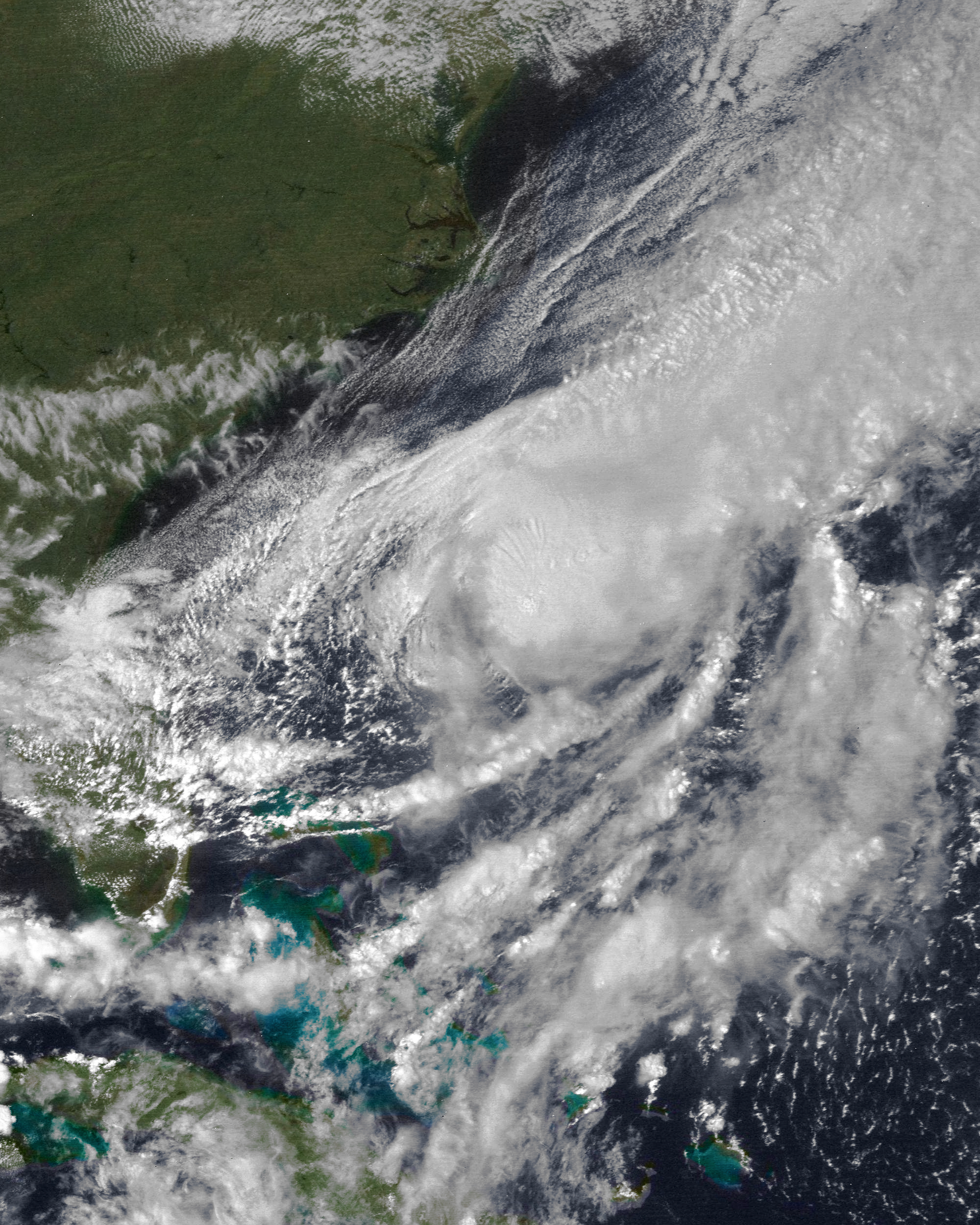
- Duration: September 26 – October 3
- Peak intensity: 65 mph (100 km/h) (1-min); 990 mbar (hPa)

On September 26, a tropical wave developed into Tropical Depression Eight while centered about 345 miles (555 km) north of Hispaniola. The depression tracked west-northwestward toward the Bahamas. Initially, the depression remained weak, but after reaching the Gulf Stream it strengthened into Tropical Storm Earl at 1200 UTC on September 29. Around that time, Earl began to veer east, lessening the threat to Florida. Early on October 1, Earl reached maximum sustained winds of 65 mph (105 km/h) and a minimum barometric pressure of 990 mbar (29 inHg). It gradually weakened thereafter, and Earl was downgraded to a tropical depression on October 3. Later that day, Earl became extratropical about 295 mi (475 km) south of Bermuda.

The threat from Earl prompted a tropical storm watch in the Bahamas and later Bermuda, while a coastal flood watch was issued in Florida. Because Earl remained offshore, impact was generally minor. Throughout Florida, Earl spawned 11 tornadoes and brought moderately heavy rainfall, peaking at 9.38 inches (238 mm) near Canal Point, Florida. In addition, light amounts of precipitation were also reported in Georgia and North Carolina. Above normal tides washed away 30 to 35 feet (9.1 to 10.7 m) of beaches, and lifeguards on St. Augustine Beach made eight rescues.

=== Hurricane Frances ===
- Category 1 hurricane (SSHWS)
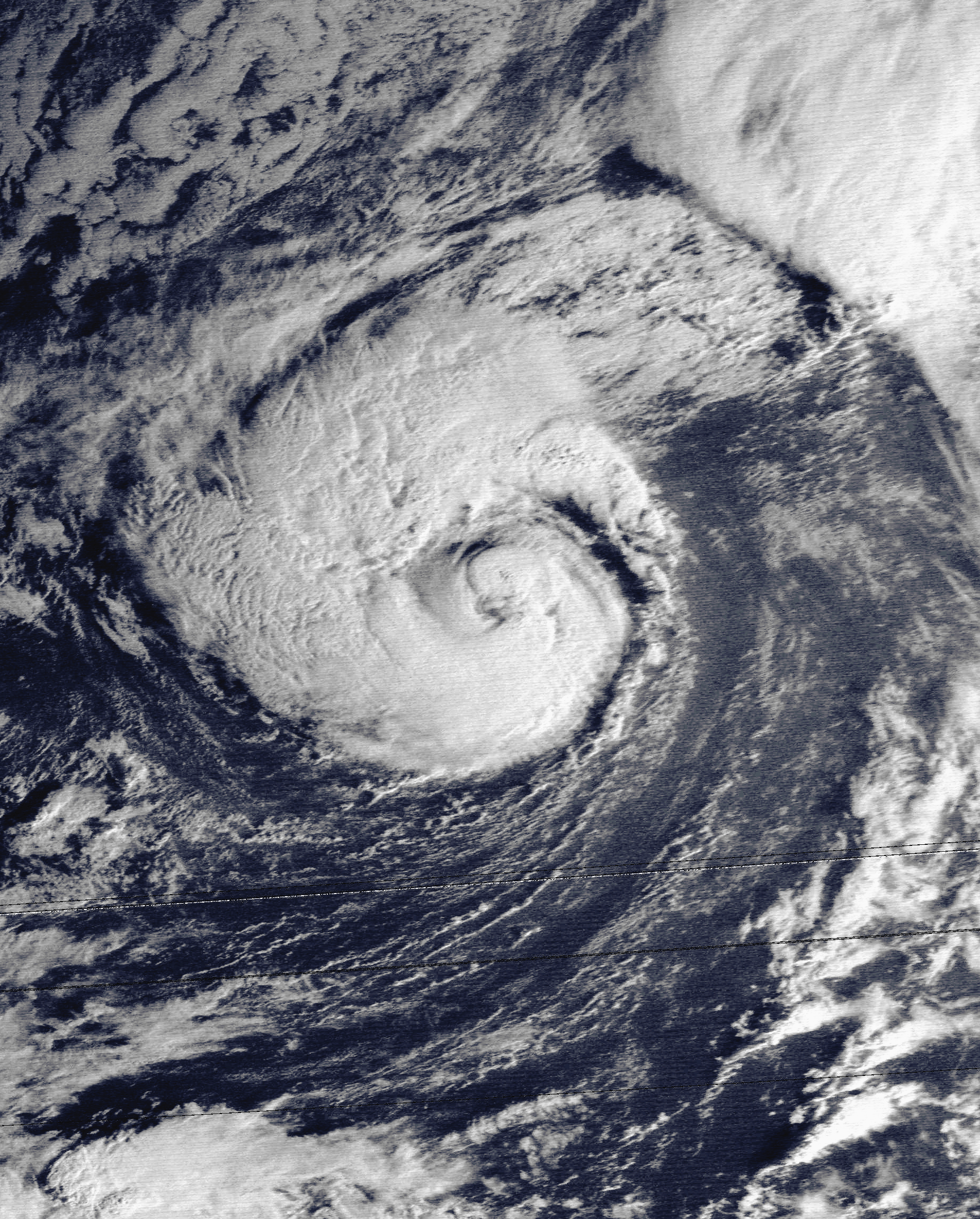
- Duration: October 23 – October 27
- Peak intensity: 85 mph (140 km/h) (1-min); 976 mbar (hPa)

A low pressure area developed along the end of a quasi-stationary frontal trough. Initially, vertical wind shear prevented deep convection from forming on the western portion of the system. After wind shear decreased, the system became a gale center late on October 22. By early on the following day, the gale center had transitioned into a tropical storm, and it is estimated that Tropical Storm Frances developed at 0600 UTC on October 23. Frances quickly strengthened after becoming a tropical storm, and was upgraded to a hurricane by 1800 UTC on that same day. After becoming a hurricane, Frances curved northeastward, and remained well east of Bermuda. By midday on October 24, Frances peaked as an 85 mph (140 km/h) Category 1 hurricane.

After reaching peak intensity, Frances began tracking over cooler sea surface temperatures, which gradually weakened the storm. The eye featured became indistinct and by late on October 25, Frances was downgraded to a tropical storm. Over the next two days, Frances began losing tropical characteristics, and was declared extratropical by early on October 27. One sailor was reported missing; however, it is unknown if it was as a result of Frances. In addition, one person on a sailboat suffered injuries during an encounter with Frances. On land, Frances caused minimal impact, limited to light rainfall across Newfoundland.

== Storm names ==
The following list of names was used for named storms that formed in the North Atlantic in 1992. This is the same naming list used for the 1986 season as no names were retired from that year.

- Andrew
- Bonnie
- Charley
- Danielle
- Earl
- Frances
- Georges (unused)
- Hermine (unused)
- Ivan (unused)
- Jeanne (unused)
- Karl (unused)
- Lisa (unused)
- Mitch (unused)
- Nicole (unused)
- Otto (unused)
- Paula (unused)
- Richard (unused)
- Shary (unused)
- Tomas (unused)
- Virginie (unused)
- Walter (unused)

=== Retirement ===
In the spring of 1993, the World Meteorological Organization retired the name Andrew from its rotating Atlantic hurricane name lists on account of its destructiveness, and it will never be used again for another Atlantic hurricane. The name was replaced with Alex in the 1998 season.

== Season effects ==
This is a table of all of the tropical and subtropical storms that formed in the 1992 Atlantic hurricane season. It includes their name, duration, peak classification and intensities, areas affected, damage, and death totals. Deaths in parentheses are additional and indirect (an example of an indirect death would be a traffic accident), but were still related to that storm. Damage and deaths include totals while the storm was extratropical, a wave, or a low, and all of the damage figures are in 1992 USD.

Saffir–Simpson scale
TD	TS	C1	C2	C3	C4	C5

1992 North Atlantic tropical cyclone season statistics
Storm name	Dates active	Storm category at peak intensity	Max 1-min wind mph (km/h)	Min. press. (mbar)	Areas affected	Damage (US$)	Deaths	Ref(s).
Unnamed	April 21–24	Subtropical storm	50 (85)	1002	None	None	None	
One	June 25–26	Tropical depression	35 (55)	1007	Florida	$2.6 million	4 (1)	
Two	July 24–26	Tropical depression	35 (55)	1015	None	None	None	
Andrew	August 16–28	Category 5 hurricane	175 (280)	922	Bahamas, Southeastern United States, Gulf Coast of the United States, Midwestern United States, Mid-Atlantic states	$27.3 billion	26 (39)	
Bonnie	September 17–30	Category 2 hurricane	110 (175)	965	Azores	Minimal	1	
Charley	September 21–27	Category 2 hurricane	110 (175)	965	Azores	Minimal	None	
Danielle	September 22–26	Tropical storm	60 (95)	1001	North Carolina, Mid-Atlantic states (Maryland), New England	Minimal	2	
Seven	September 25 – October 1	Tropical depression	35 (55)	1008	None	None	None	
Earl	September 26 – October 3	Tropical storm	65 (100)	990	Florida, Georgia, North Carolina	None	None	
Frances	October 23–27	Category 1 hurricane	85 (140)	976	Newfoundland, Iberian Peninsula	None	None	
Season aggregates
10 systems	April 21 – October 27		175 (280)	922		$27.302 billion	33 (40)	

== See also ==
- Tropical cyclones in 1992
- 1992 Pacific hurricane season
- 1992 Pacific typhoon season
- 1992 North Indian Ocean cyclone season
- South-West Indian Ocean cyclone season: 1991–92, 1992–93
- Australian region cyclone season: 1991–92, 1992–93
- South Pacific cyclone season: 1991–92, 1992–93
- South Atlantic tropical cyclone
- Mediterranean tropical-like cyclone
