= 1984 hurricane season =

1984 hurricane season may refer to:

- The 1984 Atlantic hurricane season
- The 1984 Pacific hurricane season
