= Late November 1984 nor'easter =

1984 cyclone impacting Florida, United States

Coordinates: 26.9396°N 79.5864°W

Late November 1984 Nor'easter Tropical Depression 19
- Image of the storm during the afternoon of November 23. Its well-defined cold front is seen entering eastern Cuba at that time

Meteorological history
- Formed: November 22, 1984
- Extratropical: November 29, 1984
- Dissipated: December 1, 1984

Tropical depression
- 1-minute sustained (SSHWS/NWS)
- Highest winds: 35 mph (55 km/h)
- Lowest pressure: 1005 mbar (hPa); 29.68 inHg

Overall effects
- Fatalities: 1
- Damage: $7.4 million (1984 USD)
- Areas affected: The Bahamas, Florida, Bermuda
- Part of the 1984 Atlantic hurricane season

The Late November 1984 Nor'easter occurred on the United States' Thanksgiving Day, November 22, 1984. A deep extratropical cyclone located just off the shore of Florida led to significant beach erosion and the grounding of the freighter Mercedes I for several months along the coastal town of Palm Beach. It formed unusually early, and its effects were seen unusually far south into Florida.

== Meteorological history ==
Map plotting the storm's track and intensity, according to the Saffir–Simpson scale Map key Saffir–Simpson scale Tropical depression (≤38 mph, ≤62 km/h) Tropical storm (39–73 mph, 63–118 km/h) Category 1 (74–95 mph, 119–153 km/h) Category 2 (96–110 mph, 154–177 km/h) Category 3 (111–129 mph, 178–208 km/h) Category 4 (130–156 mph, 209–251 km/h) Category 5 (≥157 mph, ≥252 km/h) Unknown Storm type Tropical cyclone Subtropical cyclone Extratropical cyclone, remnant low, tropical disturbance, or monsoon depression

When a cyclone aloft cut off from the main band of the Westerlies, it spurred cyclogenesis in the Florida Straits by November 22, which led to a nor'easter at an unusually southern latitude near the Bahamas. The surface cyclone slowly traveled through the Florida Straits up the Gulf Stream between Florida and the Bahamas before drifting back out to sea. The storm attempted to gain some central convection during several periods of its life cycle. It was at its most intense on November 23 and November 24, with a central pressure near 1005 hPa. The cyclone moved far enough to the east to allow winds and seas to subside on November 26. There is some evidence that it may have become a subtropical cyclone around November 28, while located in the vicinity of Bermuda. This is why the system is considered the 19th tropical depression of the 1984 Atlantic hurricane season.

== Effects ==
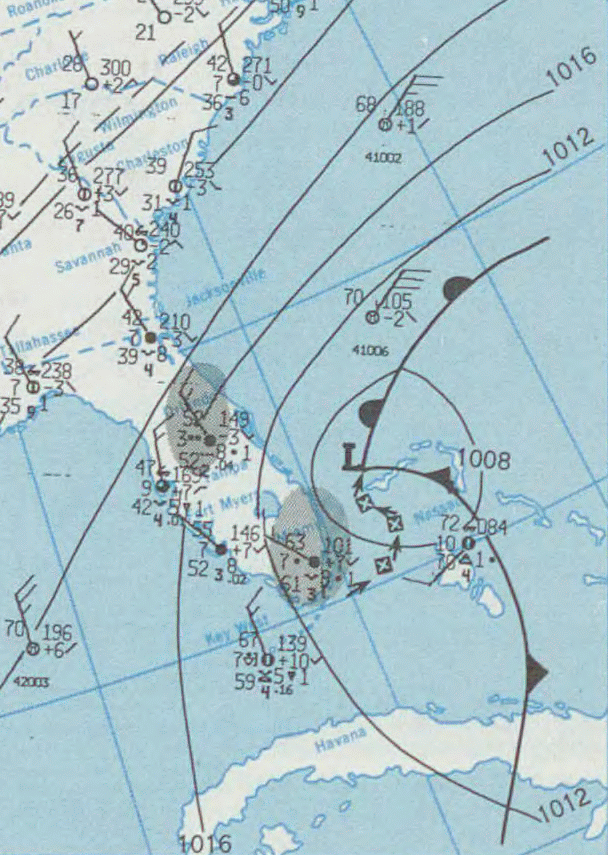
Surface analysis showing the cyclone on the morning of November 23, 1984

Significant rainfall was recorded along the Palm Beach County coast between November 21 and November 26 during this event, with local amounts of up to 11.29 inches (287 mm) measured at West Palm Beach, Florida. Surface temperatures hovered in the middle 50s°F, or around 13 °C, within the main region of impact. However, wind and high seas were the storm's main impact due to the strong pressure gradient between the cyclone's center and a 1040 hPa surface high over the Ohio Valley. Winds as high as 58 miles per hour (93 km/h) with swells of up to 20 feet (6.1 m) were reported by ships in the eastern Gulf of Mexico. Along the Atlantic coast, winds reached 58 miles per hour (93 km/h) at Vero Beach, 55 miles per hour (89 km/h) at Melbourne, 46 miles per hour (74 km/h) at Titusville, and 44 miles per hour (71 km/h) at Cocoa Beach. Offshore the Atlantic coast, seas also reached 20 feet (6.1 m). Coastal erosion took its toll between St. Augustine and Palm Beach during the three-day storm, which eventually subsided on November 26. About five-sixths of a new pier at St. Augustine was destroyed. Erosion from this cyclone would be the worst experienced in southern Brevard County until Hurricane Frances in 2004.

The storm dragged the 197-foot Venezuelan freighter Mercedes I ashore the coast of Palm Beach and through a seawall, where it remained in a socialite's backyard into early 1985. Once hauled out to sea, the vessel was sunk and became an artificial coral reef off Fort Lauderdale on March 30, 1985. A second freighter ran aground offshore Jacksonville. Damage from Vero Beach alone totalled US$3.4 million (1984 dollars). Martin County reported an addition US$4 million in losses (1984 dollars). One person perished.

== Other significant Florida extratropical cyclones ==
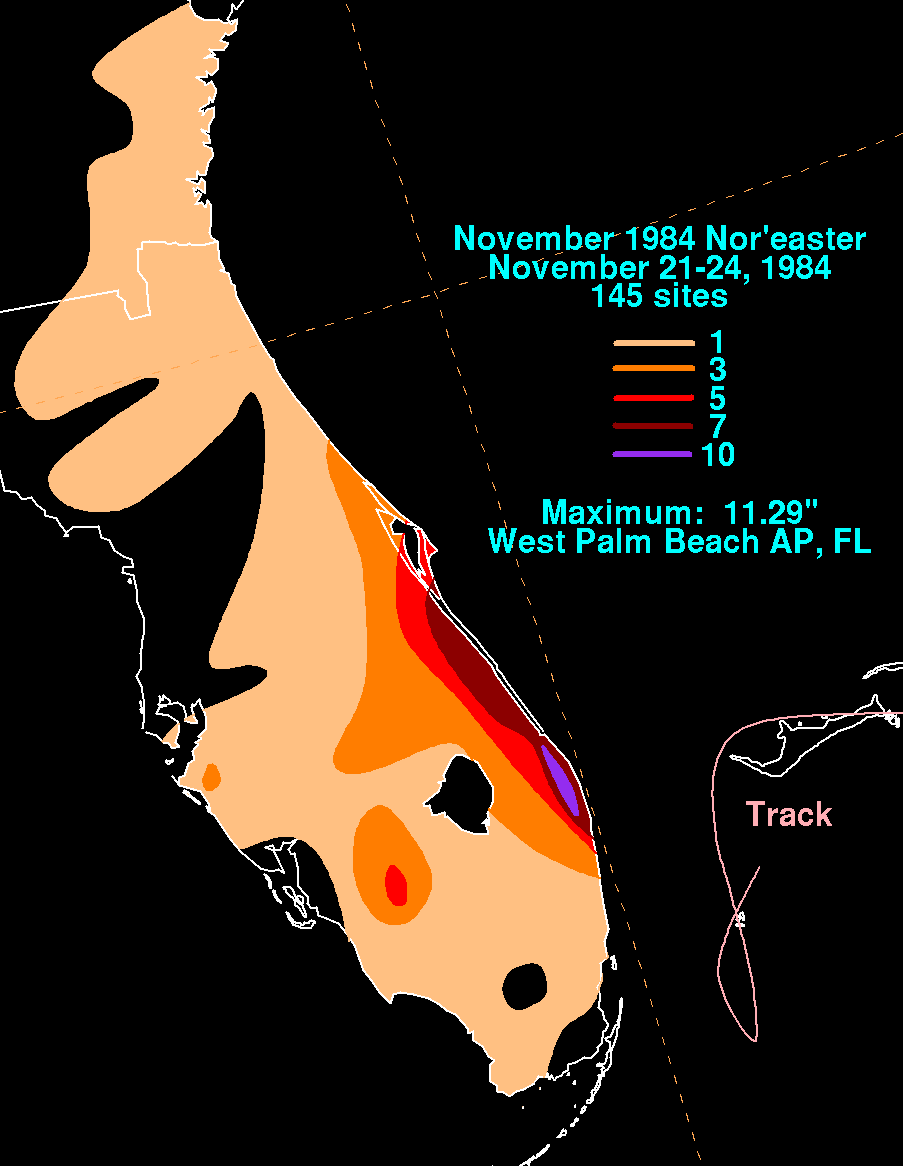
Rainfall from the Late November 1984 Florida Nor'easter across Florida and Georgia

The top three deadliest tornado outbreaks in the state's history occurred with extratropical cyclones in February 1998, March 1962, and April 1966. In 1989, a December cyclone spun up offshore northeast Florida, bringing measureable snow to Jacksonville and flurries across Sarasota in west-central Florida, and some Lake Okeechobee-effect snows downwind of the lake. In 1993, the Storm of the Century brought an intense squall line, and winds gusting over 100 miles per hour (160 km/h), to much of the Sunshine State during the early morning hours of March 13. Later that day, flurries were witnessed across the Florida Panhandle in its wake. A frontal wave which became a powerful Christmas 1994 Nor'easter moved across Florida, bringing windy and rainy conditions to the state.

== See also ==
- Climate of Florida
- Extratropical cyclone
- Surface weather analysis
