= Tropical Storm Isidore (1984) =

Atlantic tropical storm in 1984

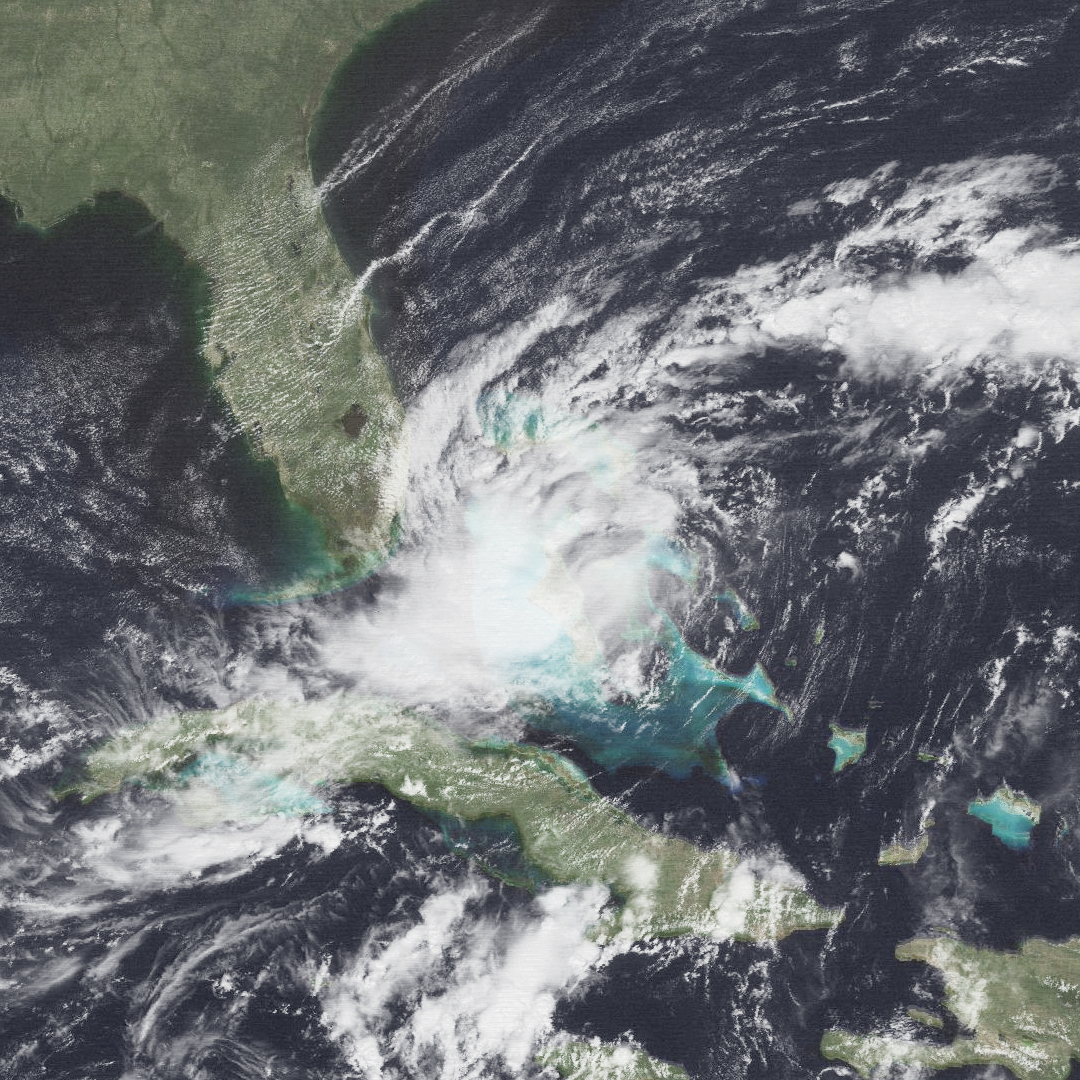
- Tropical Storm Isidore near peak intensity over the Bahamas on September 26

Meteorological history
- Formed: September 25, 1984
- Dissipated: October 1, 1984

Tropical storm
- 1-minute sustained (SSHWS/NWS)
- Highest winds: 60 mph (95 km/h)
- Lowest pressure: 999 mbar (hPa); 29.50 inHg

Overall effects
- Fatalities: 1 indirect
- Damage: $1 million (1984 USD)
- Areas affected: The Bahamas, Florida, Southeast United States
- IBTrACS
- Part of the 1984 Atlantic hurricane season

Tropical Storm Isidore was a relatively weak tropical cyclone that passed over most of the Florida Peninsula in late September 1984. The fifteenth tropical cyclone and 9th named storm of the 1984 Atlantic hurricane season. Isidore formed as a tropical depression on September 25, while situated off the southeastern Bahamas. The depression headed west, and was upgraded to a tropical storm in the central Bahamas the next day. It made landfall near Jupiter, Florida, and retaining tropical storm strength, Isidore curved to the northeast, emerging over water near Jacksonville, Florida. Isidore continued northeast until it was absorbed by a frontal system on October 1. Though damage was generally light, the storm affected several regions from the Bahamas to the U.S. East Coast. One death was reported in Florida, and total damage is estimated at $1 million (1984 USD).

== Meteorological history ==
Map plotting the storm's track and intensity, according to the Saffir–Simpson scale Map key Saffir–Simpson scale Tropical depression (≤38 mph, ≤62 km/h) Tropical storm (39–73 mph, 63–118 km/h) Category 1 (74–95 mph, 119–153 km/h) Category 2 (96–110 mph, 154–177 km/h) Category 3 (111–129 mph, 178–208 km/h) Category 4 (130–156 mph, 209–251 km/h) Category 5 (≥157 mph, ≥252 km/h) Unknown Storm type Tropical cyclone Subtropical cyclone Extratropical cyclone, remnant low, tropical disturbance, or monsoon depression

The storm system that would become Isidore originated in a nearly stationary frontal boundary situated near the Bahamas. On September 24, a ship reported winds of about 30 mph (48 km/h) in association with the disturbance. However, satellite imagery indicated that convection was just beginning to organize. Satellite imagery and Air Force reconnaissance reports documented the formation of a tropical depression early on September 25; a special statement was later issued by the National Hurricane Center (NHC) confirming the existence of the depression, and tropical cyclone advisories were initiated at 12 pm EDT. The depression moved west-northwest while tracking through the Bahamas. As it did so, it moved across Cat Island and passed near several others. The cyclone attained tropical storm status on September 26, receiving the name "Isidore".

While located near the northern tip of Andros Island, Isidore reached its peak intensity. The barometric pressure fell to 999 mb, with sustained winds of 60 mph (95 km/h). The storm continued moving northwest, though it failed to strengthen significantly over the Florida Current. The cyclone made landfall near Jupiter, Florida with sustained winds of about 50 mph (80 km/h) and subsequently moved inland. Previously, a large high pressure area over the eastern United States had prevented the cyclone from moving northward. The high moved away, allowing for Isidore to curve to the northeast, emerging over water near Jacksonville, Florida. The storm continued towards the northeast, passing about 80 mi (130 km) off of the Carolina coast. Isidore downgraded to a tropical depression on October 1, and was absorbed in a frontal zone later that day. Isidore was one of many storms during the 1984 season that formed in relatively cool baroclinic environments.

== Preparations ==
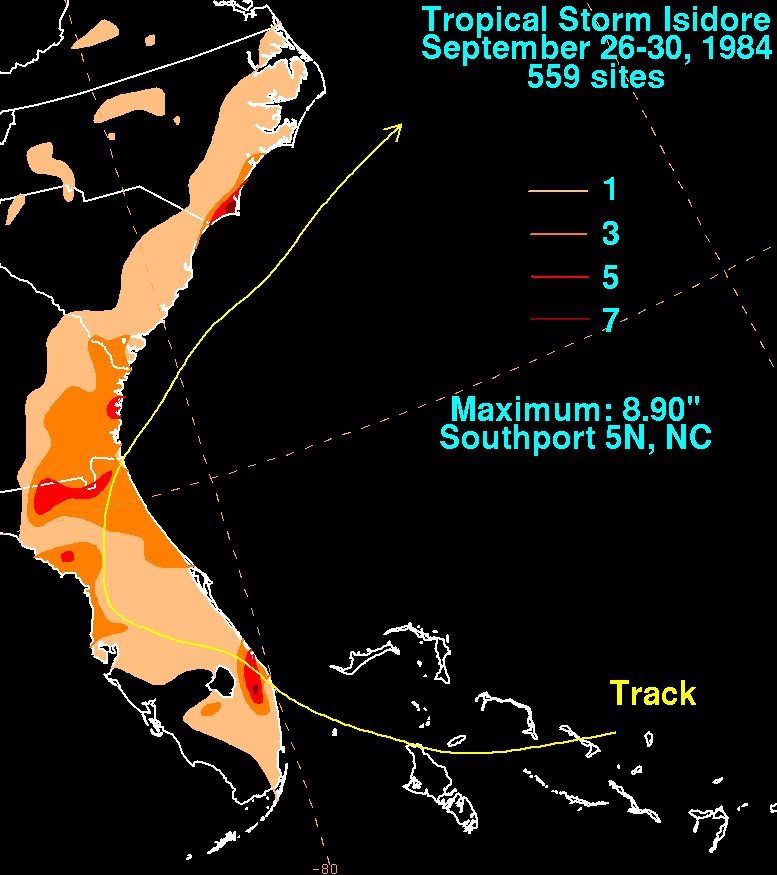
Rainfall from Isidore in the United States

Officials issued gale warnings in the Bahamas for the central and northwestern islands, including New Providence and the capital city of Nassau. Due to its mild nature, Isidore was described as a "safety test" by emergency management workers, according to the Miami Herald. Gale warnings were issued from as far south as Key West, Florida, to as far north as Virginia, including parts of Georgia, South Carolina, and North Carolina. A private meteorological service stated that Isidore was to intensify to hurricane status, leading to some confusion regarding preparations. Additionally, forecasters at the National Hurricane Center struggled to predict a more precise location of landfall in Florida, instead stating that Isidore would move ashore between Key Largo and Palm Beach. Along the Treasure Coast of Florida, citrus farmers burned seedlings potentially infected with canker to prevent heavy rains from spreading the disease. Red Cross volunteers readied a shelter with supplies such as cots and sheets, though it remained unused. In Martin County, hundreds of firefighters were on standby. Officials warned boat owners that draw bridges would not open if winds reached 40 mph (64 km/h). Students were sent home early in Indian River, Martin, and St. Lucie counties, and after-school actives were canceled. The South Beach Jetty Park in Fort Pierce was closed.

The South Florida Water Management District drained coastal canals and agricultural areas in the Palm Beach area. Schools closed in Palm Beach County on September 27. The Red Cross opened some of their emergency shelters in Dade County. In Miami, rain from the storm led to the cancellation of horse races at the Calder Race Course. State parks in Monroe County were temporarily closed. In southern portions of the state, residents prepared their boats for the storm, and 50 F-4 Phantom fighter jets were evacuated from the Homestead Air Force Base and moved to bases in South Carolina. Lumber yards, groceries stores, and hardware stores reported unusually high demand for emergency supplies, though certain smaller businesses closed early. Gasoline stations in the region "were doing bumper-to-bumper business". Farther to the south, in the Florida Keys, an emergency operations center was opened in response to the storm.

== Impact ==
In Nassau, Bahamas, Isidore produced flooding rains and gales. There, the storm forced the closure of schools and banks. Heavy precipitation fell throughout the island chain, but no serious damage was reported.

Winds from Isidore gusted to 73 mph (117 km/h) in the St. Augustine, Florida area. Elsewhere, 65 mph (105 km/h) winds were recorded. At Mayport, winds were sustained at 43 mph (69 km/h). In northern portions of the state, peak rainfall totals ranged from 5 to 7 in (130 to 180 mm), much of which was associated with an intense convective band to the north and east of the cyclone's center. Power outages were mostly minor and scattered. Tides generally ran under 3 ft (0.91 m) above normal; combined with high winds, the tides contributed to severe and widespread beach erosion along the east coast of Florida, threatening structures at times. In southeastern Palm Beach County, waves reached the seawalls of condominium complexes in Boca Raton and Highland Beach, while beach overwalks were damaged and lifeguard towers toppled at a park in the former. Delray Beach lost about half of an incomplete beach restoration project. Storm surge inundated low-lying portions of State Road A1A between Boynton Beach and Lake Worth, with a few sections closed. Additionally, segments of State Road A1A in Palm Beach were damaged.

Gusty winds in Martin County downed some power lines. Washouts occurred at a few places on Indian River Drive in Jensen Beach. On Hutchinson Island, many eggs and nests of Caretta caretta and Chelonia mydas, respectively, were destroyed. A large, $500,000 beach restoration fill in Indian River County was washed away. One man was electrocuted as a result of the storm near Orlando. Another man was injured while attempting to land his plane at Orlando Executive Airport in high winds. In the Tampa Bay area, wind gusts up to 65 mph (105 km/h) led to the closure of the Sunshine Skyway Bridge for five hours. Street flooding impacted St. Augustine and Jacksonville. In the former, a pier that had recently reopened after being destroyed by Hurricane David in 1979 suffered significant damage from Isidore. Approximately 10,000 customers lost electricity in Jacksonville, though most were restored within several hours. Winds deroofed a three-car garage near Hastings. Throughout the state, overall damage was generally insignificant.

The storm also dropped heavy precipitation along the coasts of Georgia, South Carolina, and North Carolina, with sporadic showers in parts of Virginia. In Georgia, one tornado, ranked F1 on the Fujita scale, touched down in Brunswick, damaging a metal building's roof at a steel plant and 10 cars and a garage roof at a car dealership, and demolishing a metal hut at a National Guard Armory. Several trees fell due to a tornado, with about 2,000 power outages in Glynn County. The tornado caused approximately $250,000 in damage. In North Carolina, minor beach erosion and coastal flooding occurred, with waves of approximately 10 ft (3.0 m) in height impacting Kill Devil Hills. Some freshwater flooding was also reported, especially in New Hanover County, where up to 3 ft (0.91 m) of water inundated U.S. Route 421 in Wilmington. Offshore, swells of 12 to 15 ft (3.7 to 4.6 m) extensively damaged a wooden ship, the Phoenix. The vessel "barely escaped destruction", though a crew member suffered a cracked rib. Across its path, Isidore was estimated to have inflicted $1 million in damage.

== See also ==
- List of Florida hurricanes
- List of Atlantic hurricanes
