= List of storms named Josephine =

The name Josephine has been used for six tropical cyclones and one subtropical cyclone in the Atlantic Ocean. The name has been used once in the Australian region.

In the Atlantic:

- Hurricane Josephine (1984) – long-lived Category 2 hurricane that threatened the East Coast of the United States
- Hurricane Josephine (1990) – wandered around Atlantic but never threatened land
- Tropical Storm Josephine (1996) – formed in the Gulf of Mexico, made landfall in Florida, and moved over the eastern states, causing $130 million in damage
- Tropical Storm Josephine (2002) – short-lived storm that remained in the open sea
- Tropical Storm Josephine (2008) – storm that remained in the open sea
- Tropical Storm Josephine (2020) – earliest tenth named storm on record, dissipated north of the Lesser Antilles without affecting land
- Subtropical Storm Josephine (2026) – short-lived storm that remained at sea

In the Australian region:

- Cyclone Josephine (1970) – a tropical cyclone that would enter the South-West Indian Ocean and affect Madagascar, receiving its second name Jane
