= Hurricane Josephine (1984) =

Category 2 Atlantic hurricane in 1984

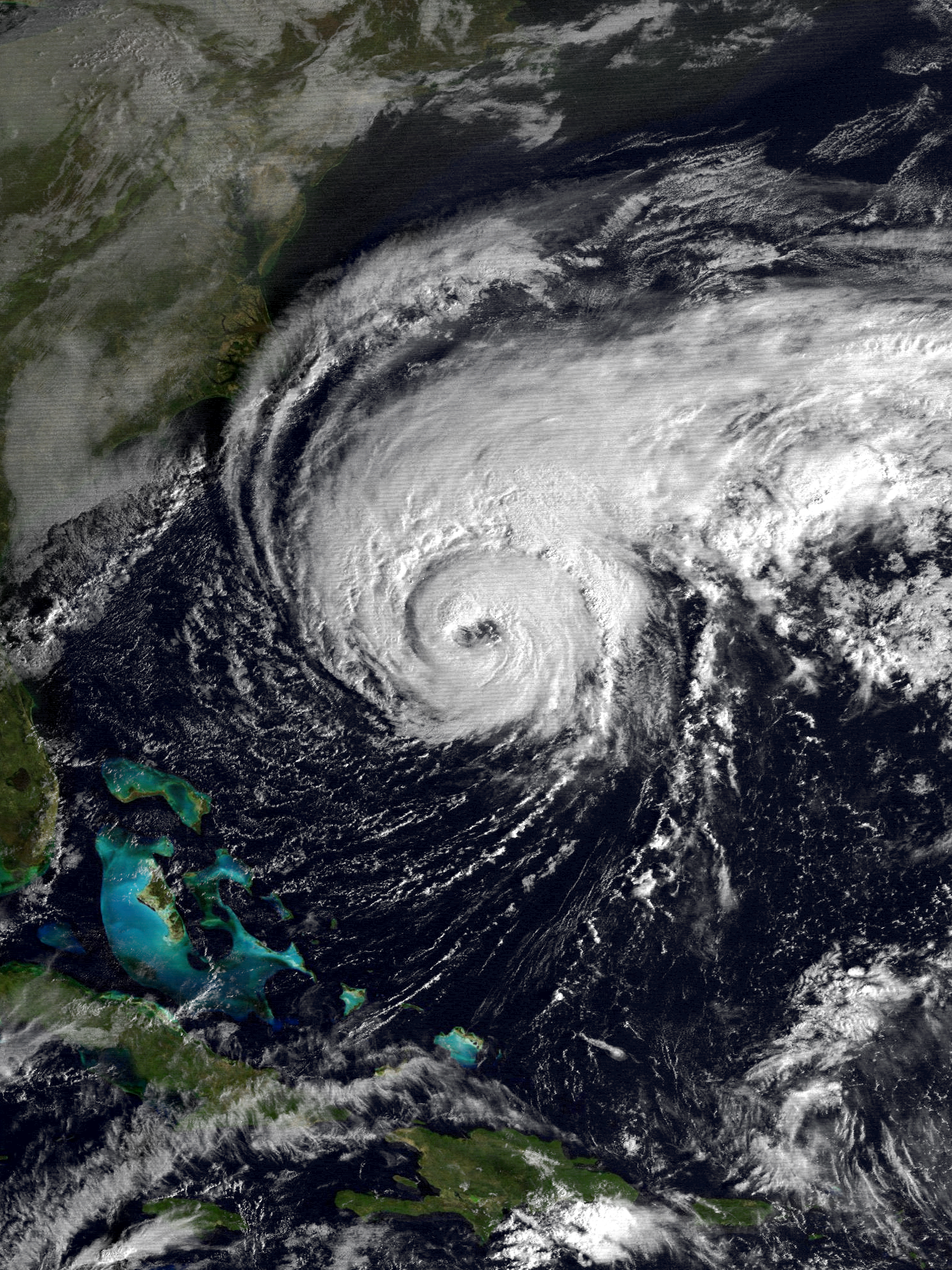
- Josephine at near peak intensity northwest of the Bahamas early on October 11

Meteorological history
- Formed: October 7, 1984
- Extratropical: October 18, 1984
- Dissipated: October 24, 1984

Category 2 hurricane
- 1-minute sustained (SSHWS/NWS)
- Highest winds: 105 mph (165 km/h)
- Lowest pressure: 965 mbar (hPa); 28.50 inHg

Overall effects
- Fatalities: 1 direct
- Areas affected: East Coast of the United States, Atlantic Canada
- IBTrACS
- Part of the 1984 Atlantic hurricane season

Hurricane Josephine was a long-lived Atlantic hurricane that threatened the East Coast of the United States for several days in October 1984. The sixteenth tropical cyclone, tenth named storm, and third hurricane of the season, Josephine developed from an area of disturbed weather near the Bahamas on October 7, forming with subtropical characteristics. It quickly organized, and gained tropical characteristics as it strengthened into a tropical storm on October 8. Gradual intensification occurred thereafter, reaching hurricane status on October 10. The storm headed northward, remaining well offshore of the eastern United States. Josephine strengthened further and peaked as a moderately strong Category 2 hurricane on the Saffir-Simpson Hurricane Scale on October 12. On the following day, Josephine weakened back to a Category 1 hurricane before becoming nearly stationary. It later headed northeastward and paralleled the coast well offshore of Nova Scotia. By October 17, Josephine weakened back to a tropical storm, shortly before beginning to execute a cyclonic loop to the south of Newfoundland. While executing the cyclonic loop, Josephine became extratropical on October 18.

Although Josephine remained well offshore of the eastern United States, the effects from the storm and an area of high pressure produced strong winds and high seas along the coast. In North Carolina, high tides caused severe beach erosion and minor damage to ocean-front houses. Minor coastal flooding occurred in New York and New Jersey. In addition, one fatality occurred when a man drowned after falling off his boat while sailing a river in Massachusetts.

== Meteorological history ==
Map plotting the storm's track and intensity, according to the Saffir–Simpson scale Map key Saffir–Simpson scale Tropical depression (≤38 mph, ≤62 km/h) Tropical storm (39–73 mph, 63–118 km/h) Category 1 (74–95 mph, 119–153 km/h) Category 2 (96–110 mph, 154–177 km/h) Category 3 (111–129 mph, 178–208 km/h) Category 4 (130–156 mph, 209–251 km/h) Category 5 (≥157 mph, ≥252 km/h) Unknown Storm type Tropical cyclone Subtropical cyclone Extratropical cyclone, remnant low, tropical disturbance, or monsoon depression

A frontal trough moved eastward off the southeastern United States on September 30, becoming stationary north of Haiti. The trough developed an area of disturbed weather that interacted with an upper-level low pressure area, resulting in the development of a subtropical depression on October 7. Upon formation, the system consisted of a very broad subtropical low, as well as a poorly defined surface circulation. As the subtropical depression drifted westward, it became further organized. By midday on October 8, an Air Force reconnaissance aircraft flight indicated that the subtropical depression intensified and acquired enough tropical characteristics to be considered a tropical storm. The National Hurricane Center named the storm Josephine.

Further intensification was slow, as Josephine was very large and existed in a relatively cool environment. Shortly thereafter, Josephine curved northward to the northeast of the Bahamas. By October 10, Josephine had strengthened into a hurricane. Josephine continued north-northeastward, and became a Category 2 hurricane on October 11. Winds increased slightly, and Josephine reached its maximum sustained winds of 105 mph (169 km/h) on October 12. Josephine weakened back to a Category 1 hurricane on October 13. That day, an area of high pressure moved off the northeastern United States, which caused Josephine to decelerate and abruptly curve northeastward, and eventually southeastward. By October 15, Josephine began to accelerate east-northeastward. Later that day, Josephine reached its minimum barometric pressure of 965 mbar (28.5 inHg).

As Josephine continued east-northeastward, it had weakened back into a tropical storm. Under the influence of an area of high pressure to the north and a nearby area of low pressure, Josephine began executing a cyclonic loop to the north while approaching Atlantic Canada. During the cyclonic loop, it transitioned into an extratropical cyclone on October 18. Shortly thereafter, the remnants of Josephine merged with a broad mid-latitude trough. The remnants of Josephine tracked southward and completed the cyclonic loop on October 19. The system eventually curved to the east-northeastward and moved in that direction until it became unidentifiable on October 21.

== Preparations and impact ==
Shortly after the system was declared a tropical storm, gale warnings were issued for the central Bahamas starting on October 8. Slightly more than 24 hours later, a hurricane watch was issued on Eleuthera and the Abaco Islands. By early on October 11, both of the alerts were discontinued. Later that day, gale warnings were issued from Cape Lookout, North Carolina to Virginia Beach, Virginia. The warning area was extended to as far north as Nantucket, Massachusetts on October 13. The warning for the area from Cape Lookout, North Carolina to Virginia Beach, Virginia was discontinued late on October 14. Simultaneously, gale warnings were issued from Nantucket to Cape Cod, Massachusetts. In addition, another gale warning was also issued from Cape Cod to Boston, Massachusetts. By October 15, all gale warnings were discontinued. Early in the hurricane's duration, NASA developed a contingency plan for delaying a landing of the space shuttle Challenger by a day in the event Josephine passed near Kennedy Space Center. The shuttle crew filmed the hurricane from orbit using an IMAX camera. This footage of the storm was featured in the 1985 IMAX documentary The Dream is Alive.

Although Josephine remained well offshore of the eastern United States, the storm produced strong winds and high seas in combination with an area of high pressure. On the Outer Banks of North Carolina, strong winds were reported from October 11 to October 14. At Diamond Shoals, sustained winds were at 58 mph (93 km/h), with gusts as high as 75 mph (121 km/h). However, most of the damage caused by Josephine was due to high tides along the East Coast of the United States. On Hatteras Island, tides were 5.8 ft (1.8 m) above the mean sea level. In addition, wave heights of 8 to 12 ft (2.4 to 3.7 m) were reported on the island. Due to the tides, over-wash occurred on highways along the Outer Banks, which in turn caused those roads to close. Coastal erosion was also occurred in that area; most notably, the tides washed away nearly all protective sand dunes built by the Civilian Conservation Corps during the Great Depression, especially in the Rodanthe area. In the absence of protective sand dunes, the Outer Banks became vulnerable to future storms that would also produce high tides. Minor damage to houses were reported due to high tides near Nags Head and Kill Devil Hills; damage was mostly from the detachment of steps and porches.

Effects were somewhat lighter in Virginia. Gale-force winds were also observed in the state, with winds of 46–52 mph (74–84 km/h) being reporting at Cape Henry and Chesapeake Light, respectively. High tides also occurred in Virginia, with waves of 9 to 10 ft (2.7 to 3.0 m) reported at Chesapeake Light. Tidal flooding was reported in Delaware. In response to the hurricane, the United States Coast Guard activated extra workers in the event of any storm emergencies. High winds in Sea Bright, New Jersey washed an abandoned cabin cruiser into the jetty along the coast. In the same town, officials closed a portion of New Jersey Route 36. Helicopters evacuated three coast guardsmen from Ambrose Light in New York Harbor and two guardsmen from West Bank Light. Tides between 2 and 4 ft (0.61 and 1.22 m) above normal resulted in minor coastal flooding on Long Island, New York and in parts of New Jersey. Officials closed 1.5 mi (2.4 km) of a road in Southampton due to 3.5 ft (1.1 m) deep flooding. In Massachusetts, a man fell off his boat and drowned while sailing the North River amidst large swells produced by Josephine. The outer fringes of the storm produced wind and rainfall in Cape Cod. In Newfoundland, Josephine dropped light rainfall, peaking at slightly less than 1 in (25 mm).

Josephine also caused major effects to marine interests. High waves, estimated to have exceeded 15 ft (4.6 m), disabled a sailboat with a crew of six on it. They were quickly rescued after issuing a distress signal to a nearby tanker vessel. The storm caused the loss of 1,799 bags of sorghum from water damage when a freighter encountered Josephine en route to Baltimore, Maryland. The major shipping lanes of North America were severely impacted, with more than 25 ships reporting winds of at least 58 mph (93 km/h) over a period of nine days. Furthermore, at least five of those ships reported hurricane-force winds during a period of six days. The highest wind speed reported from a ship was 92 mph (148 km/h), which was observed on October 16.

== See also ==
- Other storms of the same name
