= Tropical Storm Josephine (1996) =

Atlantic tropical storm in 1996

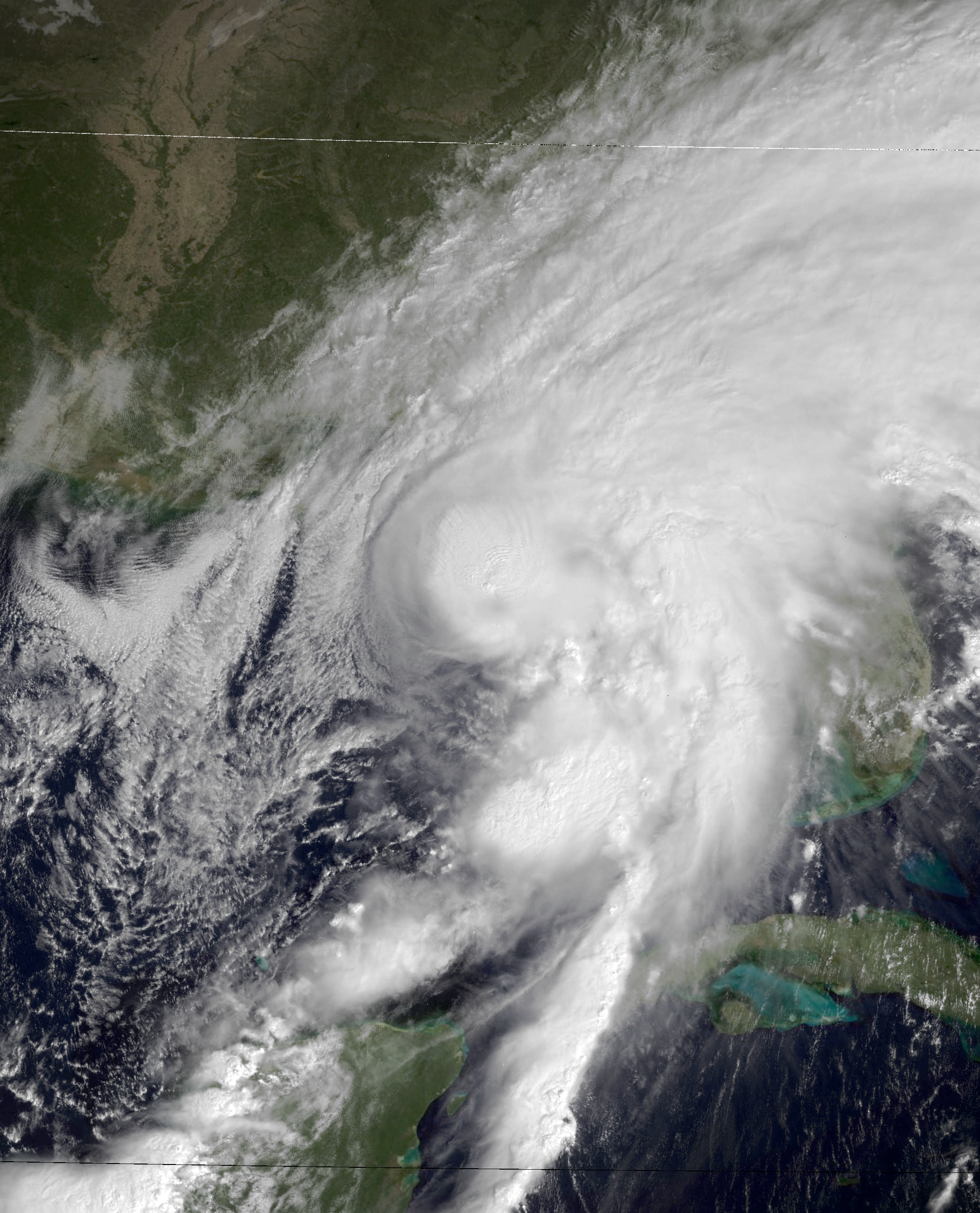
- Tropical Storm Josephine in the Gulf of Mexico shortly after peak intensity on October 7

Meteorological history
- Formed: October 4, 1996
- Extratropical: October 8, 1996
- Dissipated: October 13, 1996

Tropical storm
- 1-minute sustained (SSHWS/NWS)
- Highest winds: 70 mph (110 km/h)
- Lowest pressure: 981 mbar (hPa); 28.97 inHg

Overall effects
- Fatalities: 3 indirect
- Damage: $130 million (1996 USD)
- Areas affected: Southeastern United States, Mid-Atlantic, Northeastern United States, Atlantic Canada
- IBTrACS
- Part of the 1996 Atlantic hurricane season

Tropical Storm Josephine was an unusual tropical cyclone that moved from west to east across the Gulf of Mexico in October 1996. It formed on October 4 as a tropical depression from the remnants of a cold front. Early in its duration, the system interacted with a ridge over the central United States, which produced strong winds and high tides along the Texas coast. The outer rainbands caused flooding rainfall in southern Texas, and in Louisiana, high tides flooded roads and stranded residents on Grand Isle. Moving generally to the east due to a trough, the depression intensified into a tropical storm on October 6, and the next day reached peak winds of 70 mph (110 km/h) while approaching the west coast of Florida. Josephine made landfall in Taylor County near peak intensity early on October 8, and soon after became extratropical. While moving ashore, the storm produced a high storm surge reaching 9.3 ft (2.8 m) in Suwannee. High tides flooded about 3,600 houses along the west coast. Josephine also produced heavy rainfall, which flooded hundreds of homes, and high winds, which left 400,000 people without power. The storm also spawned at least 16 tornadoes, one of which damaged 130 homes.

The extratropical remnants of Josephine moved along the eastern coast of the United States, producing wind gusts as strong as 77 mph (124 km/h) in St. Mary's County and in Ocean City, Maryland. The winds caused widespread power outages, including 26,000 in Virginia and 31,000 in New Jersey. Heavy rainfall flooded low-lying areas and rivers along the storm's path, including in North Carolina which had previously been affected by hurricanes Bertha and Fran earlier in the year. In the southeastern United States, the storm contributed to dozens of traffic accidents, which killed a person each in Georgia, North Carolina, and Virginia. Damage throughout the United States totaled about $130 million (1996 USD). Josephine later moved offshore, and after passing southeast of Cape Cod, moved through Atlantic Canada with moderate rainfall and gusty winds. The storm later restrengthened in the northern Atlantic Ocean before merging with another extratropical storm near Iceland on October 16.

== Meteorological history ==
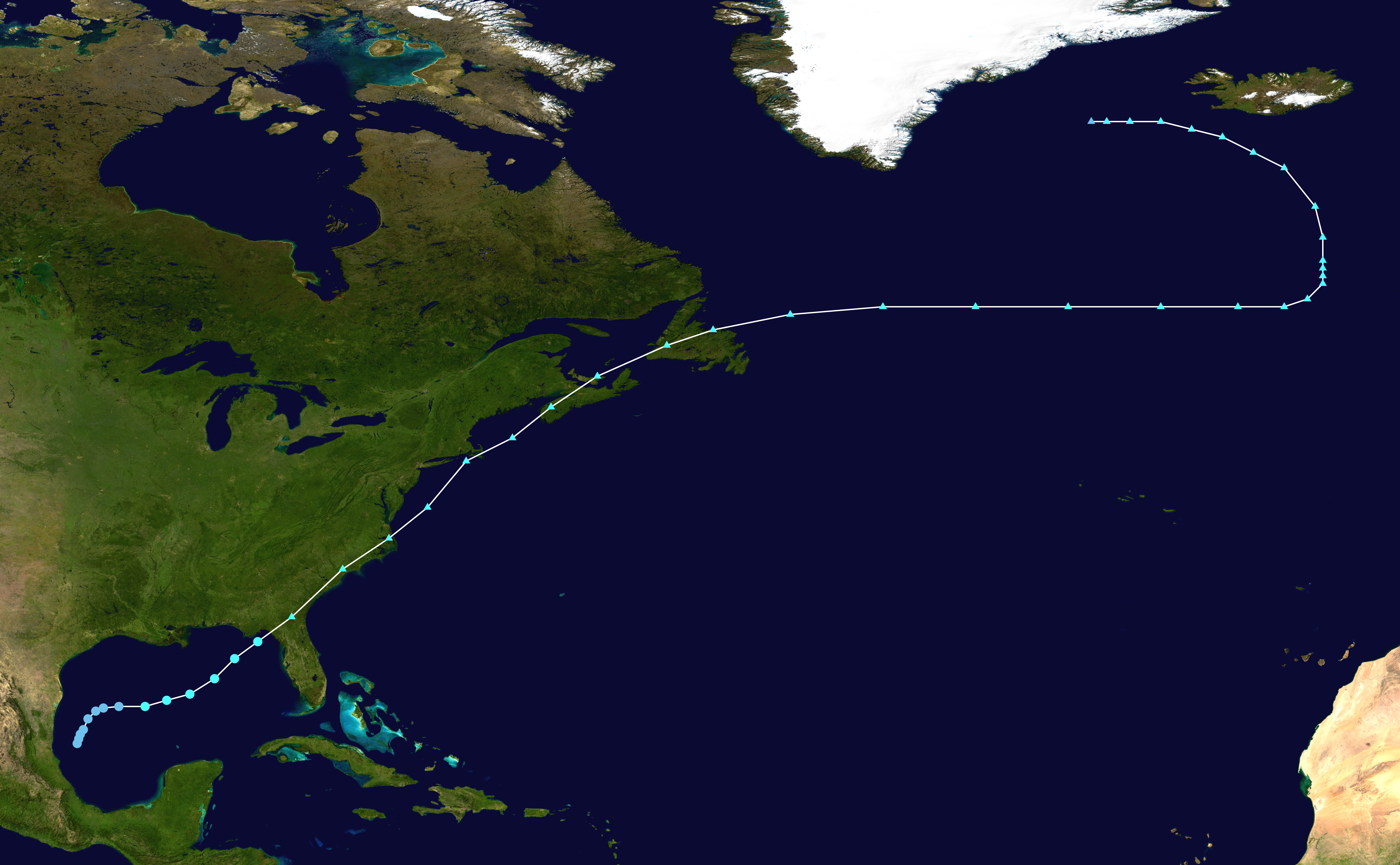
Map plotting the storm's track and intensity, according to the Saffir–Simpson scale Map key Saffir–Simpson scale Tropical depression (≤38 mph, ≤62 km/h) Tropical storm (39–73 mph, 63–118 km/h) Category 1 (74–95 mph, 119–153 km/h) Category 2 (96–110 mph, 154–177 km/h) Category 3 (111–129 mph, 178–208 km/h) Category 4 (130–156 mph, 209–251 km/h) Category 5 (≥157 mph, ≥252 km/h) Unknown Storm type Tropical cyclone Subtropical cyclone Extratropical cyclone, remnant low, tropical disturbance, or monsoon depression

In late September 1996, a cold front stalled over the southwestern Gulf of Mexico, producing an area of convection. The thunderstorms were possibly related to the same tropical wave that spawned Hurricane Hernan in the eastern Pacific Ocean. A low pressure area formed in the Bay of Campeche by October 2, although initially upper-level conditions did not favor tropical cyclogenesis. The convection became more persistent on October 3 and gradually became better organized. On October 4, classifications based on the Dvorak technique began, and later that day the Hurricane Hunters flew into the system. Based on the data from the flight, it is estimated that Tropical Depression Ten formed at 1800 UTC that day off the northeast coast of Mexico. During its formative stages, the depression interacted with a ridge near the Great Lakes to produce strong winds across the Gulf Coast of the United States. With weak steering currents, the depression moved slowly to the northeast, and initially, wind shear prevented further organization. On October 6, a strong trough caused the system to accelerate to the east-northeast. The storm's west to east motion across the Gulf of Mexico was unusual although not unprecedented.

On October 6, the banding features became better defined, and the depression intensified into Tropical Storm Josephine. Further intensification followed, and Josephine attained peak winds of about 70 mph (110 km/h) on October 7. This was based on flight-level winds of 85 mph (137 km/h), and while near peak intensity, the storm developed a partial eyewall. Josephine accelerated to the northeast while maintaining peak winds, and it made landfall in Taylor County, Florida at 0330 UTC on October 8. By that time, Josephine was losing tropical characteristics, and shortly thereafter the storm transitioned into an extratropical cyclone as it moved over Georgia. The remnants continued to accelerate to the northeast, having weakened quickly to winds of 50 mph (85 km/h). It moved along the East Coast of the United States, emerging from North Carolina into the western Atlantic, and later crossed Atlantic Canada. On October 12, the remnants of Josephine turned to the north and later to the northwest within the general flow of the north Atlantic Ocean. The next day, the storm strengthened to again reach its peak winds of 70 mph (110 km/h). On October 16, the storm merged with another extratropical storm near Iceland.

== Preparations and impact ==
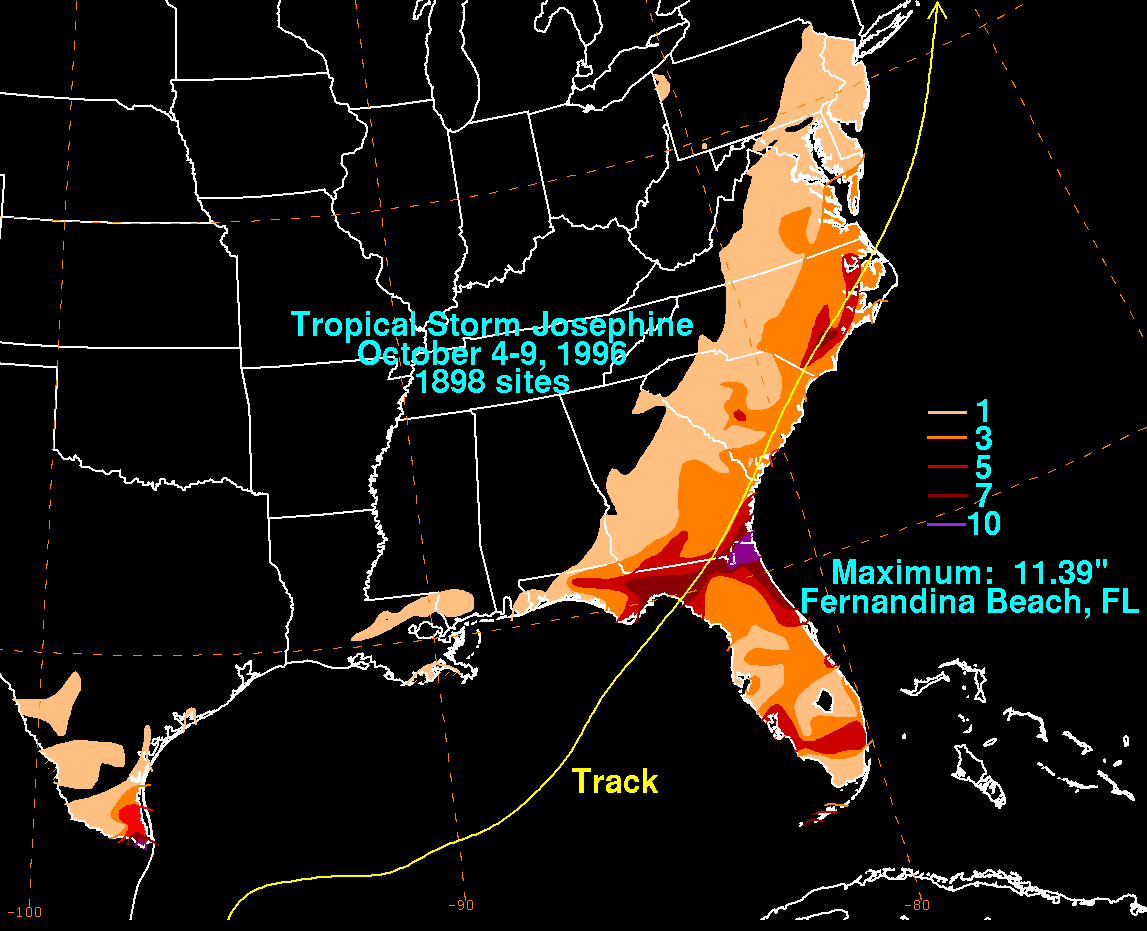
Rainfall totals from Tropical Storm Josephine

About 19 hours before landfall, the National Hurricane Center (NHC) issued a tropical storm warning from Apalachicola to Venice, Florida, which was preceded by a tropical storm watch six hours prior. As the storm intensified further, the NHC issued a hurricane warning from Apalachicola to Anclote Key, and extended the tropical storm warning westward to Fort Walton Beach. The agency later issued a tropical storm warning for the Atlantic coast from Cape Canaveral to Little River Inlet in South Carolina. Officials ordered evacuations for barrier islands in nine Florida counties along the gulf coast, and about 3,000 people stayed in shelters. Government offices closed along the storm's projected path in the state. Later, the storm forced the cancellation of part of Bob Dole's bus tour through New York, and postponed a search for the wreck of TWA Flight 800. Game one of the 1996 World Series was postponed by one day due to the storm.

While Josephine was forming, it produced high tides of 3 to 4 ft (0.91 to 1.22 m) above normal that flooded coastal regions and eroded beaches along the Texas coast. Coastal flooding covered portions of Texas State Highway 316 and John F. Kennedy Memorial Causeway. The storm's outer periphery dropped locally heavy rainfall that reached 10.81 in (275 mm) at Brownsville International Airport, which flooded homes in Brownsville and streets near San Benito. Light rainfall also occurred elsewhere along the gulf coast. In Louisiana, tides were 4 ft (1.2 m) above normal, which flooded portions of Louisiana Highway 1 and several houses. The floods damaged two houses in Mandeville, and damage statewide was estimated at $5.5 million. After residents refused to evacuate Grand Isle, over 200 people were stranded when floodwaters rose.

Satellite image of Tropical Storm Josephine near landfall

Josephine made landfall in northwestern Florida along Apalachee Bay and produced a high storm surge of around 9.3 ft (2.8 m) in Suwannee, causing minor to moderate beach erosion. The storm produced widespread tropical storm force wind gusts in the state, and the highest sustained winds were 45 mph (72 km/h) along the Sunshine Skyway Bridge; the same location reported a peak gust of 72 mph (115 km/h). Josephine dropped heavy rainfall in the state, peaking at 11.39 in (289 mm) in Fernandina Beach. The storm also spawned at least 16 tornadoes in northern Florida, most of which caused minor tree damage. One 400 yd (370 m) wide tornado, rated an F2, remained on the ground for 7 mi (11 km) in Edgewater, which damaged 130 houses, 30 of them severely. The tornado caused a woman to have a heart attack in Edgewater, and its damage was estimated at $2.4 million. In western Florida, the high tides flooded roads and buildings along the coast. Between Levy to Lee county along the gulf coast, Josephine flooded about 3,600 homes, mostly west of U.S. Route 19. The heaviest storm surge damage was in Pinellas County, where about 1,400 homes were affected, causing $25 million in damage. One person was injured in the county when a man was surfing in rough seas. The high tides damaged three fishing piers along the west coast. In Clay County, flooding rains forced about a dozen families to seek shelter elsewhere, and a few roads were washed out. In Jacksonville, high rains flooded hundreds of roads and caused schools countywide to close. Street flooding occurred as far south as the Florida Keys. High winds caused sporadic wind damage across northern Florida, and about 400,000 people lost power statewide. Following the storm, President Bill Clinton declared 16 counties as disaster areas, which made them eligible for federal assistance in reconstructing.

When the remnants of Josephine moved into Georgia, rainfall of over 7 in (180 mm) flooded portions of Georgia State Route 40 and destroyed six houses along the St. Marys River. A woman died after driving into a downed tree in the state. In South Carolina, the storm caused flash flooding that covered roads and cars, after 6 in (150 mm) of precipitation fell. Wind gusts in the state reached 60 mph (97 km/h) along the coast, while high tides caused minor beach erosion. The remnants of Josephine spawned a weak tornado in Horry County that downed trees and power lines. Heavy rainfall, including reports of 4 in (100 mm) in three and a half hours, also affected North Carolina, which flooded low-lying areas, rivers, and portions of several roads including U.S. Route 70. A woman and her child required rescue from a flooded road in Chadbourn. In some areas of eastern North Carolina, the storm raised river levels only weeks after they receded following Hurricane Fran. High winds of up to 70 mph (110 km/h) downed trees and power lines, causing power outages and dozens of traffic accidents; one man died while driving amid heavy rainfall. High tides flooded barrier islands and caused erosion in beaches, previously affected by hurricanes Bertha and Fran earlier in the year. In conjunction with a cold front, Josephine spawned three tornadoes in the state along the state's central coastline. The tornadoes destroyed several mobile homes, uprooted trees, and brought down power lines.

Satellite image of Post-Tropical Storm Josephine traveling north the Eastern Seaboard on October 8

After having tracked across the southeastern United States, Josephine emerged into the western Atlantic Ocean as a strong extratropical cyclone and remained near the coast. It continued to bring strong winds and heavy rainfall. In southeastern Virginia, where wind gusts reached 63 mph (101 km/h) at the Chesapeake Bay Bridge–Tunnel, the storm left about 26,000 people without power, while flooding contributed to over 70 traffic accidents. A three car accident killed a man in the state. In neighboring Maryland, the storm produced a peak wind gust of 77 mph (124 km/h) in St. Mary's County and in Ocean City, which knocked down trees onto houses and left about 7,000 people without power. In the Chesapeake Bay, waves of 6 ft (1.8 m) in height caused minor coastal damage and flooded portions of the coastline, including along Maryland Route 238. In Ocean City, a 160 ft (49 m) barge broke from its moorings during the storm, which later washed ashore. About 4,000 people lost power in Delaware, where winds reached 58 mph (93 km/h) and high tides, peaking at 7.6 ft (2.3 m) at Lewes, flooded oceanfront homes and a portion of Delaware Route 1. High rainfall caused the Christina River to crest at 10.6 ft (3.2 m), causing some people to require rescue from their cars. About 1,500 people lost power in southeastern Pennsylvania, when high winds knocked down some tree limbs onto power lines. In neighboring New Jersey, high winds of around 70 mph (110 km/h) left about 31,000 homes without power, and 12 houses lost their roofs during the storm. In both New Jersey and New York, rainfall was around 1 to 3 in (25 to 76 mm), causing minor street flooding. While passing offshore New England, the remnants of Josephine produced gusts as high as 68 mph (109 km/h) at Blue Hill Meteorological Observatory in Massachusetts. Minor street flooding occurred in the state after the storm dropped up to 4.50 in (114 mm) of rainfall on Cape Cod. Throughout New England, the high winds downed trees and branches, causing scattered power outages in Rhode Island, Massachusetts, New Hampshire, and Maine. Nationwide, damage was estimated at $130 million (1996 USD).

Later, the remnants of Josephine moved across Atlantic Canada, where rainfall peaked at 2.76 in (70 mm) in northern Newfoundland. The strongest winds in the region were 52 mph (83 km/h), strong enough to cause ferry service to be canceled or delayed. In Amherst and Fort Lawrence, the storm caused power outages and school closings.

== See also ==
- Hurricane Earl (1998)
- List of Florida hurricanes (1975-1999)
- Other storms of the same name
- Tropical Storm Nestor (2019)
