= 1984 Atlantic hurricane season =

- Season summary map

Seasonal boundaries
- First system formed: June 11, 1984
- Last system dissipated: December 24, 1984

Strongest storm
- Name: Diana
  - Maximum winds: 130 mph (215 km/h) (1-minute sustained)
  - Lowest pressure: 949 mbar (hPa; 28.02 inHg)

Seasonal statistics
- Total depressions: 20
- Total storms: 13
- Hurricanes: 5
- Major hurricanes (Cat. 3+): 1
- Total fatalities: 41–44 total
- Total damage: $233.74 million (1984 USD)

Related articles
- Timeline of the 1984 Atlantic hurricane season; 1984 Pacific hurricane season; 1984 Pacific typhoon season; 1984 North Indian Ocean cyclone season

The 1984 Atlantic hurricane season was the most active since 1971, though the season was below average in hurricanes and major hurricanes. (Note: A major hurricane is a storm that ranks as Category 3 or higher on the Saffir–Simpson hurricane wind scale.) It officially began on June 1, 1984, and lasted until November 30, 1984. These dates conventionally delimit the period of each year when most tropical cyclones form in the Atlantic basin. Although the first tropical depression developed northeast of the Bahamas on June 11, no tropical cyclones intensified into a tropical or subtropical storm until August 19, an unusually late date. The final system, Hurricane Lili, dissipated near the north coast of the Dominican Republic on December 24. The 1984 season was an active one in terms of named storms, but most of them were weak and stayed at sea. Most of the cyclones tracked through the northwest subtropical Atlantic west of the 50th meridian to near the Eastern coast of the United States between mid-August and early October.

The most intense tropical cyclone of the season was Hurricane Diana, which peaked as a Category 4 hurricane on the Saffir–Simpson scale. Meandering erratically offshore the Carolinas, Diana weakened to a Category 1 hurricane before making landfall in North Carolina. Diana was the first hurricane to strike a nuclear power plant, but without incident. Hurricane Klaus, the most damaging storm of the season, caused $157 million (1984 USD) in damage in the Lesser Antilles, (Note: All damage figures are in 1984 USD, unless otherwise noted) with a vast majority of that total in the British Virgin Islands. Also of note, Tropical Storm Fran became the second-deadliest cyclone in the history of the Cabo Verde Islands, killing 29 to 32 people. Overall, the systems of the 1984 season caused about $233.74 million in damage and 41-44 fatalities. Unusually, no hurricanes developed directly from tropical waves in 1984, which usually are the source of the strongest storms in an Atlantic hurricane season.

== Seasonal forecasts ==
Predictions of tropical activity in the 1984 season
Source	Date	Named storms	Hurricanes	Major hurricanes	Ref
Average (1981–2010)		12.1	6.4	2.7
Record high activity		30	15	7†
Record low activity		1	0†	0†
CSU	July 23, 1983	11	8	N/A
WRC	Early 1984	7	4	N/A
CSU	May 24, 1984	10	7	N/A
CSU	July 30, 1984	10	7	N/A
	Actual activity	13	5	1

Forecasts of hurricane activity are issued before each hurricane season by noted hurricane experts such as Dr. William M. Gray and his associates at Colorado State University (CSU). A normal season, as defined by the National Oceanic and Atmospheric Administration (NOAA) in the period from 1981 to 2010, has approximately 12 named storms, with 6 of those reaching hurricane status. About 3 hurricanes strengthen into major hurricanes, which are tropical cyclones that reach at least Category 3 intensity on the Saffir–Simpson scale.

On July 23, 1983, forecasters at CSU predicted an above-average season in 1984 with a total of 11 tropical storms developing, 8 of which would reach hurricane status, under the assumption that sea-level pressures over the Caribbean Sea and Gulf of Mexico would be normal. Early in 1984, the Weather Research Center (WRC) forecast on the other hand called for a below-average season with seven named storms, with four of those strengthening into a hurricane. on May 24, 1984, forecasters at CSU revised their prediction downwards to a total of 10 tropical storms, 7 of which would reach hurricane status, as the easterly Quasi-biennial oscillation cycle had lasted longer than expected and the previously expected La Niña event in 1984 had yet to form and was now not expected until the autumn or winter, On the other hand, sea-level pressures over the Caribbean Sea and Gulf of Mexico were more favorable than expected. These numbers were unchanged in CSU's next season outlook, issued on July 30. None of these predictions included a forecast for the number of major hurricanes. Ultimately, the predictions issued by CSU proved to be too high for hurricanes and too low for tropical storms, with 13 subtropical or tropical storms forming in 1984 and 5 of those reaching hurricane status. CSU attributed the overforecast of hurricanes to the easterly QBO cycle not changing during the hurricane season as was expected and the sea-level pressures from August to October being less favorable than expected, and the underforecast of tropical storms to the unusual amount of formation in the subtropics from mid-latitude residual frontal activity.

== Seasonal summary ==
The 1984 Atlantic hurricane season officially began on June 1 and ended on November 30. On June 11, the first tropical depression developed northeast of the Bahamas. However, no tropical cyclones attained tropical or subtropical storm status until August 19, an unusually late date. Of the 20 cyclones that formed in the Atlantic basin in 1984, 13 strengthened into a tropical or subtropical storm, slightly above-average and the highest number in a season since 1971. However, a below-average number intensified into a hurricane or major hurricane, five and three, respectively. Six storms during the season had subtropical characteristics at some point in their track, those being Subtropical Storm One, Tropical Storm Cesar, Hurricane Hortense, Hurricane Josephine, Hurricane Klaus, and Hurricane Lili. Unusually, no hurricanes developed from tropical waves in 1984, which usually are the source of the strongest storms in an Atlantic hurricane season. The last storm of the season, Hurricane Lili, dissipated on December 24 near the north coast of the Dominican Republic. Collectively, the cyclones of the 1984 season caused about $233.74 million in damage and 41-44 fatalities.

Tropical cyclogenesis began with two short-lived tropical depressions in June, the first of which developed on June 11. After the second one dissipated on June 20, Tropical Depression Three did not form until July 24, more than a month later. August featured five cyclones, a tropical depression, Subtropical Storm One, and tropical storms Arthur, Bertha, and Cesar. Seven systems developed in September, including a tropical depression and six named storms, Diana, Edouard, Fran, Gustav, Hortense, and Isidore. Diana became the most intense tropical cyclone of the season, peaking as a Category 4 hurricane with maximum sustained winds of 130 mph (215 km/h) and a minimum atmospheric pressure of 949 mbar (28.0 inHg). A tropical depression and Hurricane Josephine formed in October. Similarly, another tropical depression and Hurricane Klaus developed in November. The season's final system, Hurricane Lili, developed on December 12 and dissipated on December 24.

The season's activity was reflected with a cumulative accumulated cyclone energy (ACE) rating of 84, which is classified as "near normal". ACE is, broadly speaking, a measure of the power of the hurricane multiplied by the length of time it existed, so storms that last a long time, as well as particularly strong hurricanes, have high ACEs. It is only calculated for full advisories on tropical systems at or exceeding 39 mph (63 km/h), which is the threshold for tropical storm strength.

== Systems ==
=== Tropical Depression One ===
- Tropical depression (SSHWS)
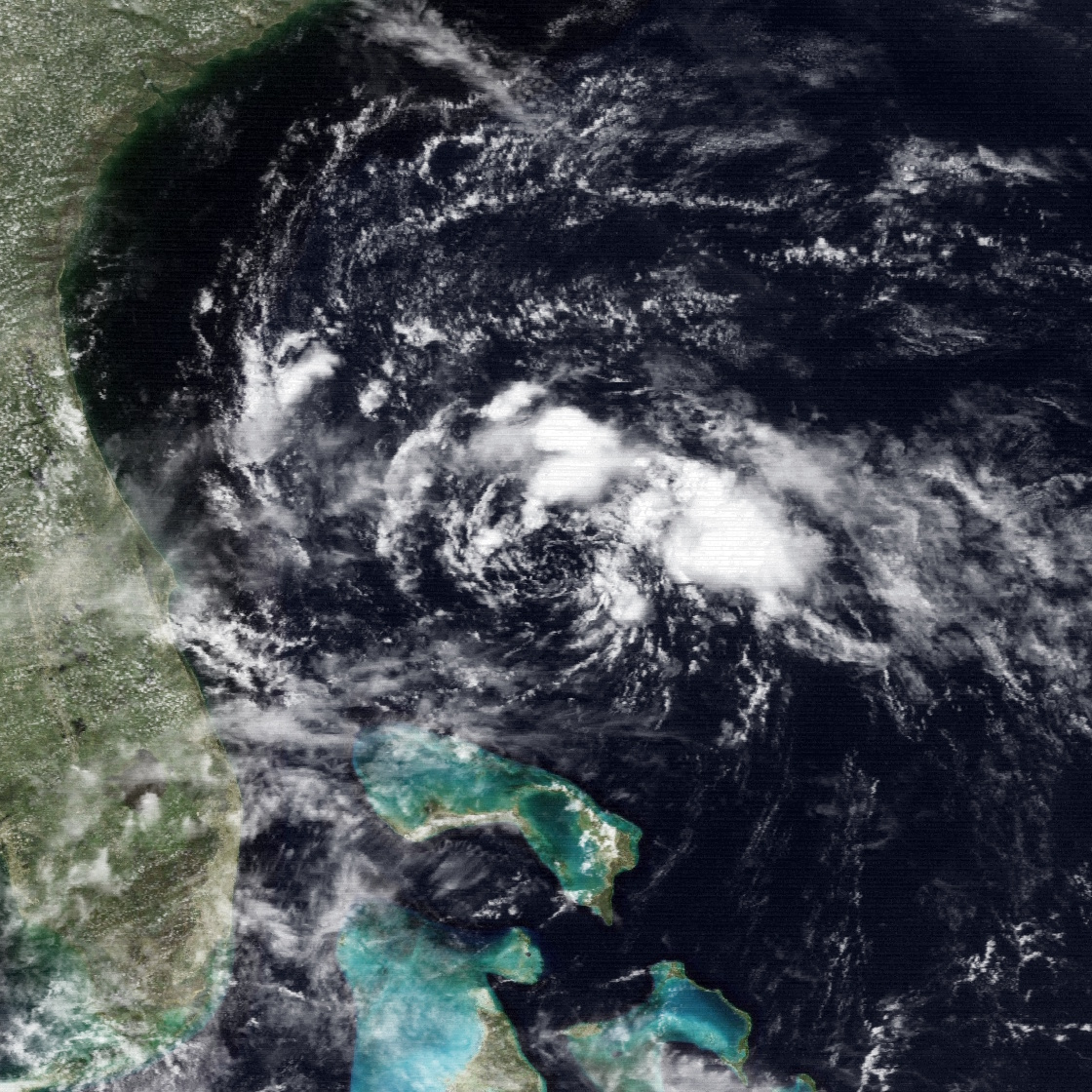
- Duration: June 11 – June 14
- Peak intensity: 35 mph (55 km/h) (1-min); ≤1016 mbar (hPa)

By June 11, an upper-level low caused thunderstorm development off the Florida coast, which caused the formation of a tropical depression. Moving westward, the depression moved into St. Augustine, causing a total of 5.02 in (128 mm) of rainfall at Jacksonville Beach, Florida, as its main thunderstorm activity was concentrated north of the center. It dissipated as a tropical cyclone on June 14 while moving through the Florida panhandle. The small remnant low continued moving westward inland of the Gulf coast, causing occasional redevelopment of thunderstorm activity as the system moved into Louisiana, before both the thunderstorm activity and low-pressure area dissipated by June 17.

=== Tropical Depression Two ===
- Tropical depression (SSHWS)
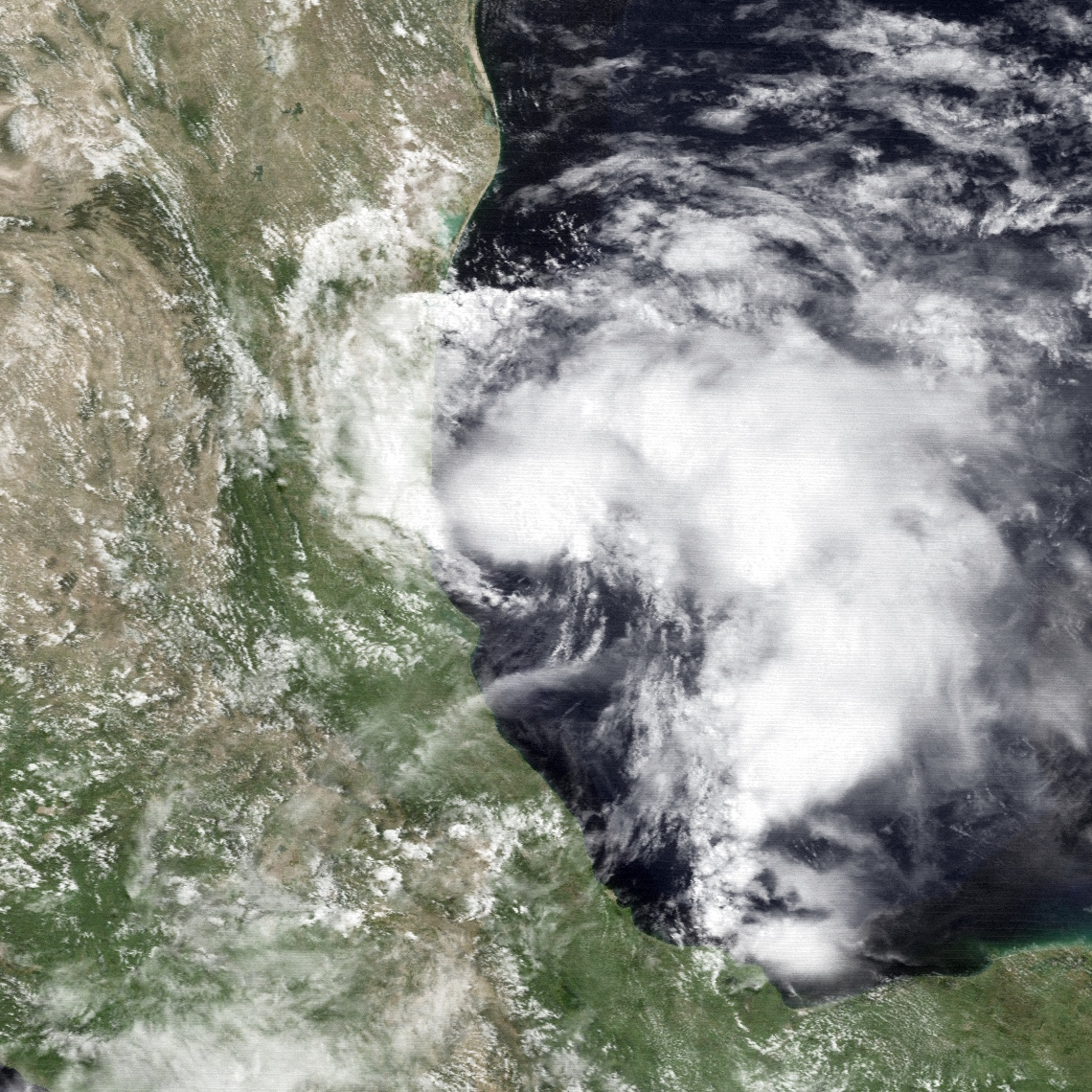
- Duration: June 18 – June 20
- Peak intensity: 35 mph (55 km/h) (1-min); 1008 mbar (hPa)

An upper-level low-pressure area traversing the southern Gulf of Mexico spawned convective activity over the Isthmus of Tehuantepec on June 16. This convective area waxed and waned somewhat in intensity, until becoming a larger disturbance on June 18. A surface low soon formed, and around 12:00 UTC that day, the system developed into a tropical depression over the Bay of Campeche. With vertical wind shear preventing significant further intensification, the depression made landfall near Tampico, Tamaulipas, with winds of 35 mph (55 km/h). The depression quickly dissipated over the mountainous terrain of eastern Mexico. The cyclone and its precursor dropped heavy rainfall in some areas, including a peak total of 11.43 in (290 mm) of precipitation in San Lucas Ojitlán, Oaxaca.

=== Tropical Depression Three ===
- Tropical depression (SSHWS)
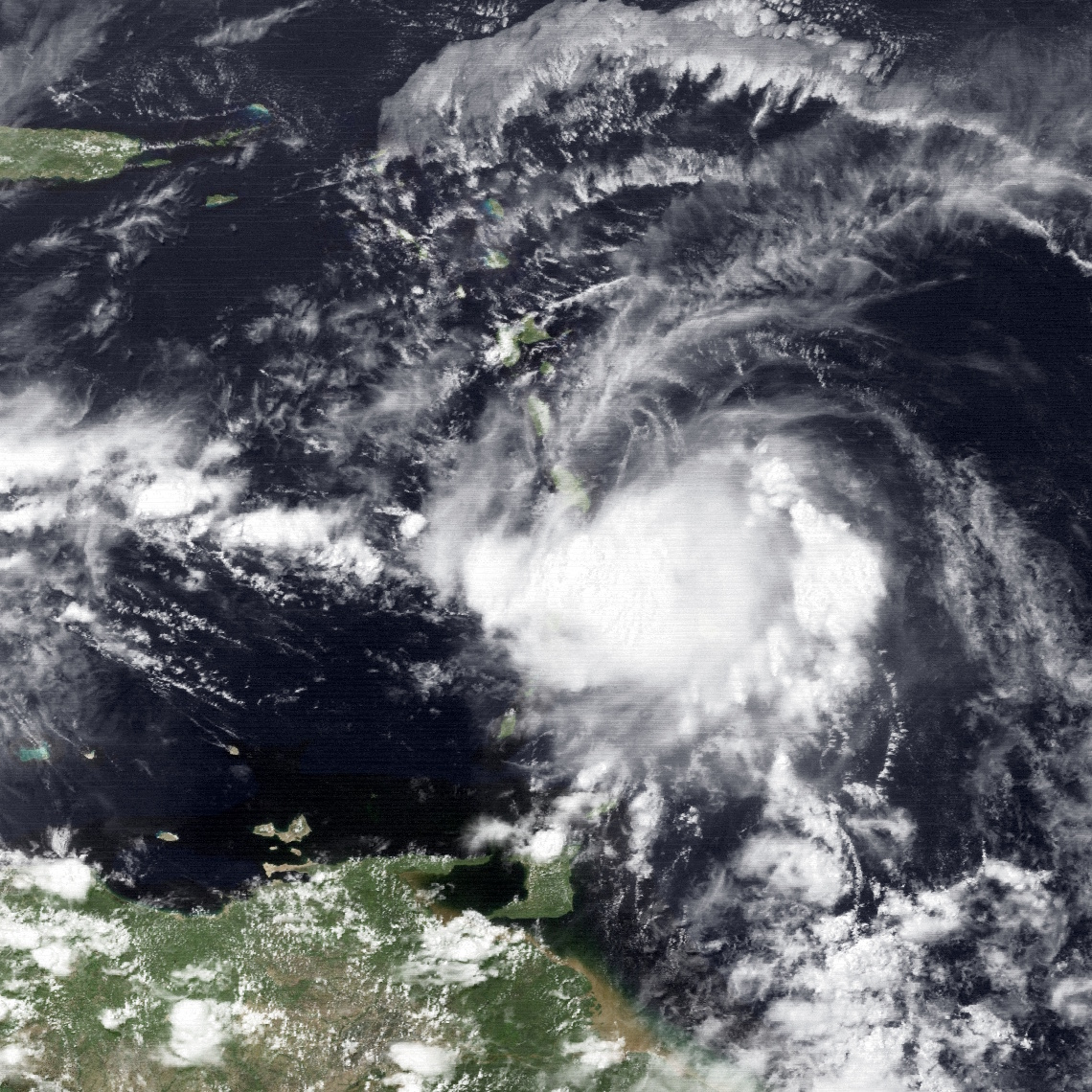
- Duration: July 24 – July 26
- Peak intensity: 35 mph (55 km/h) (1-min); 1000 mbar (hPa)

A tropical depression formed about 800 mi (1,285 km) east of the Windward Islands on July 24. Moving west-northwestward, the depression passed between Martinique and Saint Lucia early on the following day. On the latter, the storm dropped up to 8 in (200 mm) of precipitation. The Castries River overflowed its banks, washing away three homes in the eastern section of Castries. Two commercial fisherman were reported missing. Barbados recorded up to 6 in (150 mm) of rainfall in association with the system. The depression entered the Caribbean Sea and failed to intensify further, dissipating about halfway between the Dominican Republic and Venezuela late on July 26.

=== Subtropical Storm One ===
- Subtropical storm (SSHWS)
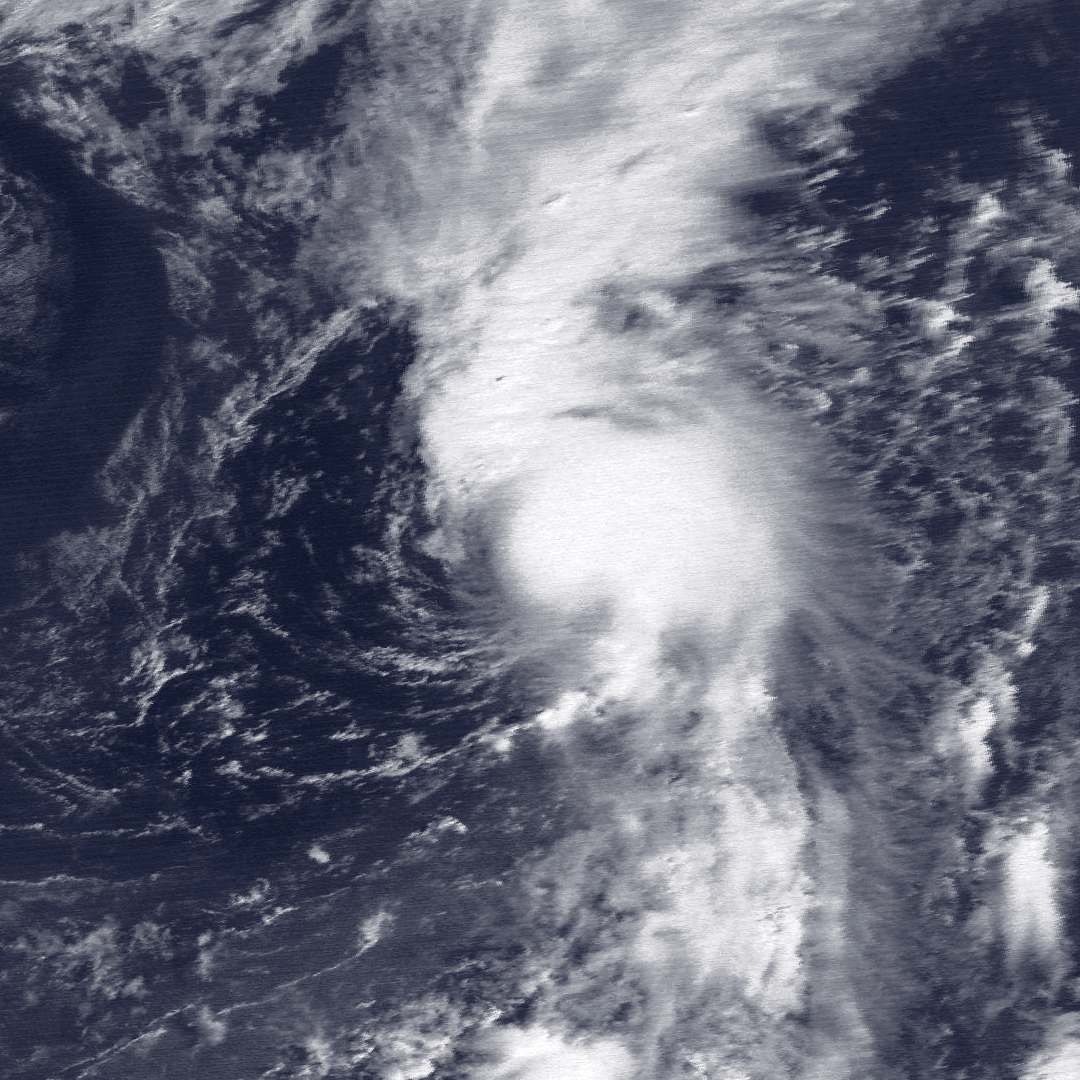
- Duration: August 18 – August 21
- Peak intensity: 60 mph (95 km/h) (1-min); 1000 mbar (hPa)

A weak frontal trough generated a low-pressure system that organized into a subtropical depression north of Bermuda on August 18. The depression headed northeast and strengthened to a subtropical storm. It is believed to have merged with a front on August 21. The history of Subtropical Storm One is not entirely certain, as satellite images were largely unavailable due to a failure of the VISSR unit on GOES EAST (then GOES-5), and this system remained at the fringe of the GOES WEST and Meteosat throughout its existence. Wind gusts up to 65 mph (105 km/h) were reported on the southwest coast of Newfoundland. In addition, a weather office on the island reported rainfall at 2.1 in (53 mm).

=== Tropical Storm Arthur ===
- Tropical storm (SSHWS)
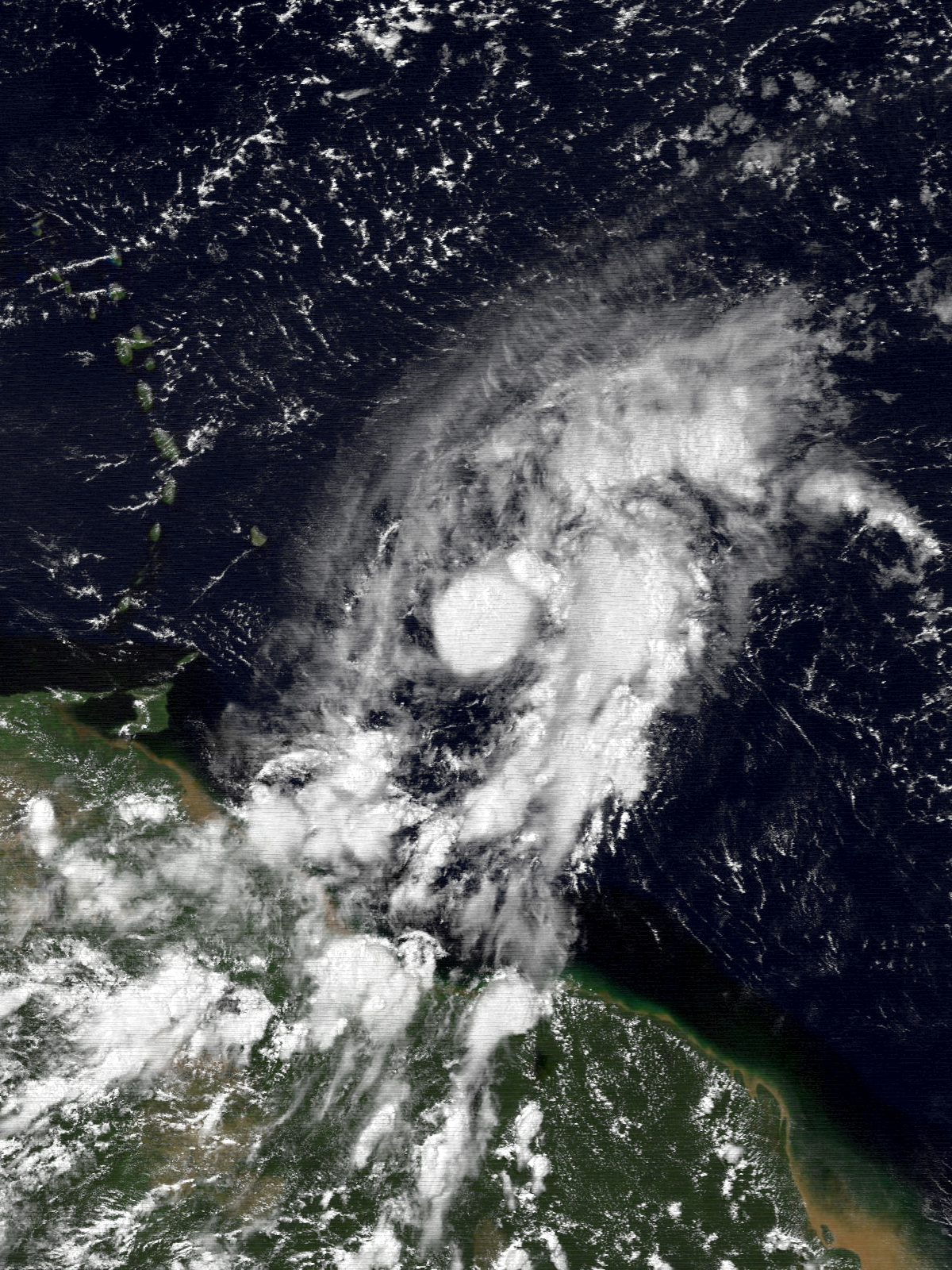
- Duration: August 28 – September 5
- Peak intensity: 50 mph (85 km/h) (1-min); 1004 mbar (hPa)

A well-defined tropical wave emerged into the Atlantic from the west coast of Africa on August 23. Moving westward and later northwestward, the system remained to the south of a persistent shearing pattern that inhibited the development of several tropical waves. A reconnaissance aircraft flight indicated that a tropical depression formed late on August 28 roughly 700 mi (1,100 km) east of Trinidad. On the next day, another reconnaissance flight recorded tropical storm conditions, and thus, the depression intensified into Tropical Storm Arthur. The cyclone attained its peak intensity several hours later with maximum sustained winds of 50 mph (85 km/h) and a minimum barometric pressure of 1,004 mbar (29.6 inHg). Arthur was downgraded to a depression on September 1 after being negatively impacted by vertical wind shear, and dissipated on September 5 about halfway between the Bahamas and Bermuda. Despite its close proximity to the Lesser Antilles, Arthur caused no significant impact on land as it was a tropical depression at the time.

=== Tropical Storm Bertha ===
- Tropical storm (SSHWS)
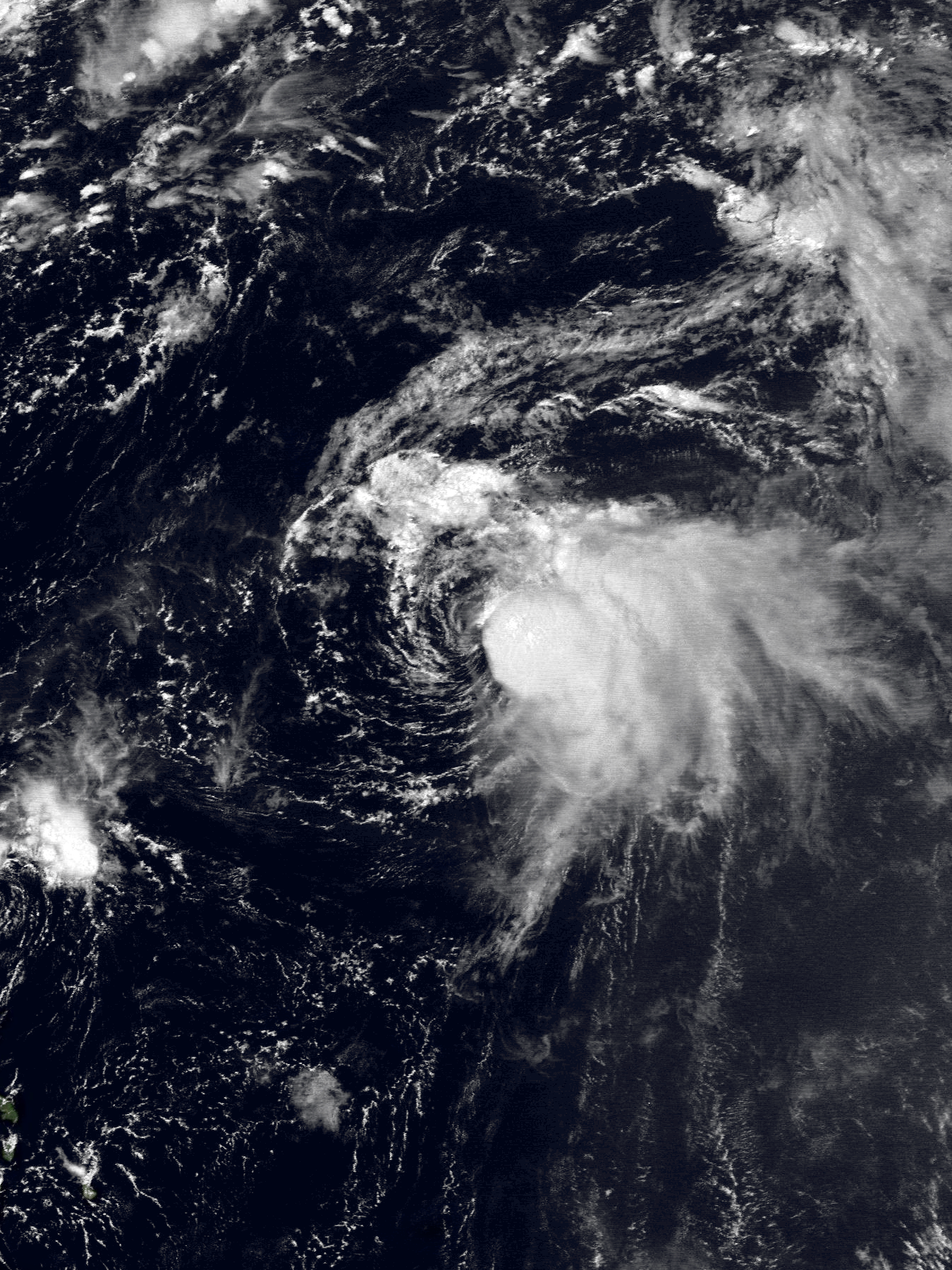
- Duration: August 30 – September 4
- Peak intensity: 40 mph (65 km/h) (1-min); 1007 mbar (hPa)

On August 26, a tropical wave emerged into the Atlantic from the west coast of Africa. Tracking westward, the wave developed into a tropical depression about 1,170 mi (1,885 km) west-southwest of the southwesternmost islands of Cabo Verde and in close proximity to the east of Arthur. A reconnaissance flight into the depression on August 31 indicated that it strengthened into Tropical Storm Bertha. Later that day, Bertha peaked as a minimal tropical storm with maximum sustained winds of 40 mph (65 km/h) and a minimum barometric pressure of 1,007 mbar (29.7 inHg). The system moved northwestward due to a weakening high pressure ridge to the north. Based on observations from reconnaissance flights on September 1, Bertha was downgraded to a tropical depression. On September 2, Bertha turned north-northeastward into response to an approaching cold front. The cold front then eroded the high pressure ridge, causing the cyclone to accelerate northeastward. Bertha later merged with the cold front on September 4.

=== Tropical Storm Cesar ===
- Tropical storm (SSHWS)
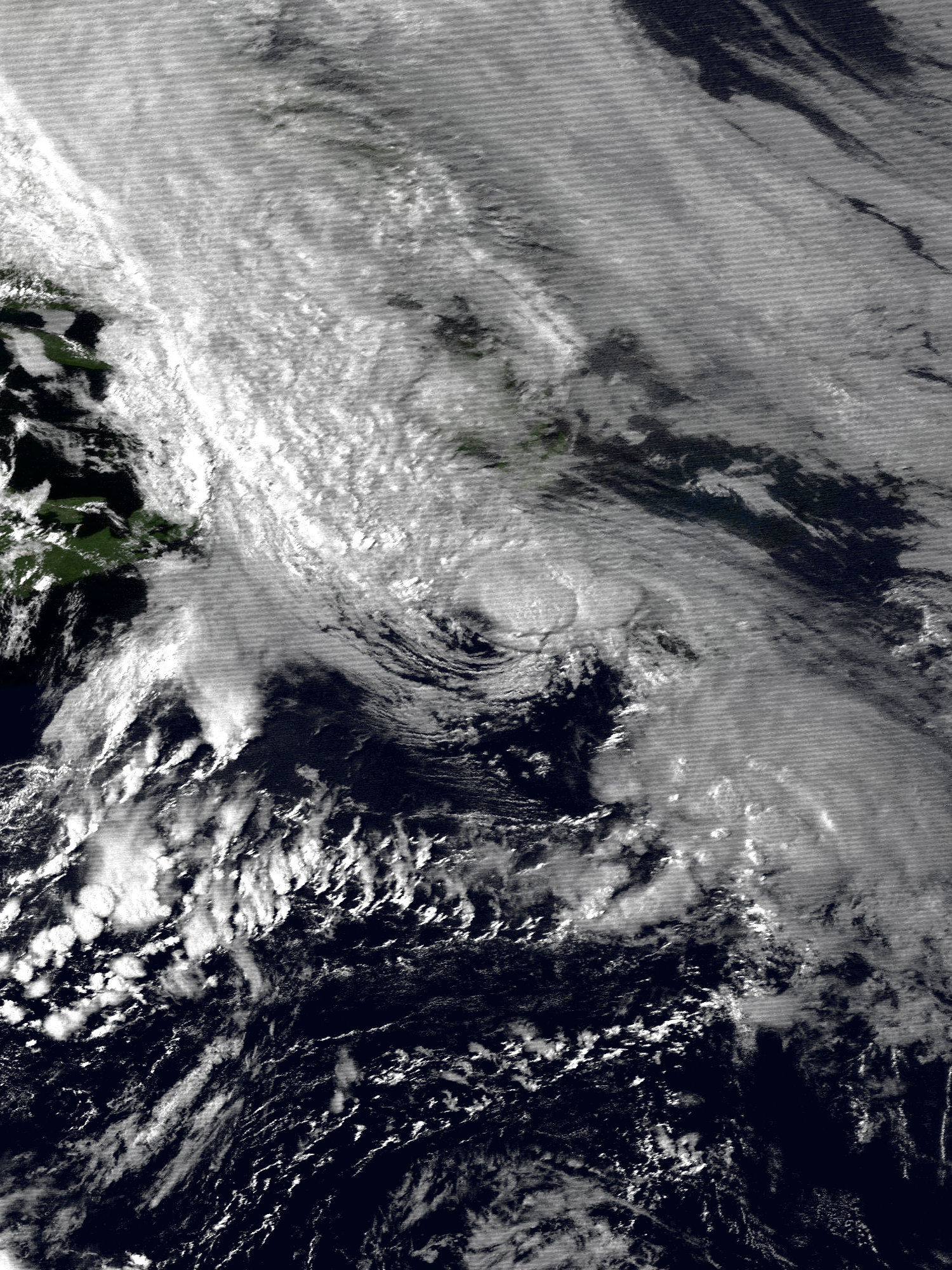
- Duration: August 31 – September 2
- Peak intensity: 60 mph (95 km/h) (1-min); 994 mbar (hPa)

The National Hurricane Center detected a low-level cloud circulation east of Jacksonville, Florida, on August 30. Moving north to northeastward due to a high pressure ridge to the east and a surface high pressure cell to the west, the system organized into a subtropical depression early on August 31 approximately 200 mi (320 km) northwest of Bermuda. Based on a ship report of sustained winds of 40 mph (65 km/h), the subtropical depression transitioned into a tropical system and intensified into a tropical storm, receiving the name Cesar. On September 2, Cesar peaked with winds of 60 mph (95 km/h) and a minimum atmospheric pressure of 994 mbar (29.4 inHg), but soon merged with an extratropical low east of Newfoundland.

=== Tropical Depression Seven ===
- Tropical depression (SSHWS)
- Duration: September 6 – September 8
- Peak intensity: 35 mph (55 km/h) (1-min);

A tropical wave moved across Central America into the far eastern north Pacific Ocean by August 28. The system moved westward with no signs of development until September 1, when an upper-level low to its north across the Gulf of Mexico caused an area of thunderstorms to form just south of the Mexican coastline. An upper trough developed across the southern Plains of the United States, which slowly lured the northern portion of this increasingly large disturbance northward through the Mexican Isthmus. The southern portion moved westward, developing into Hurricane Marie. For a short while, Marie acted as a source of vertical wind shear from the west for this system, halting further development.

By September 6, the disturbance had emerged into the southwest Gulf of Mexico and consolidated into a smaller system which had enough organization to be classified as a tropical depression, the seventh of the season. The depression moved north-northwest into northeast Mexico on the afternoon of September 7, dissipating completely on September 8. Heavy rains fell over parts of Mexico, with a peak total of 34.65 in (880 mm) in Chicontepec de Tejeda, Veracruz. This precipitation contributed to ongoing floods, especially in Tamaulipas and Veracruz.

=== Hurricane Diana ===
- Category 4 hurricane (SSHWS)
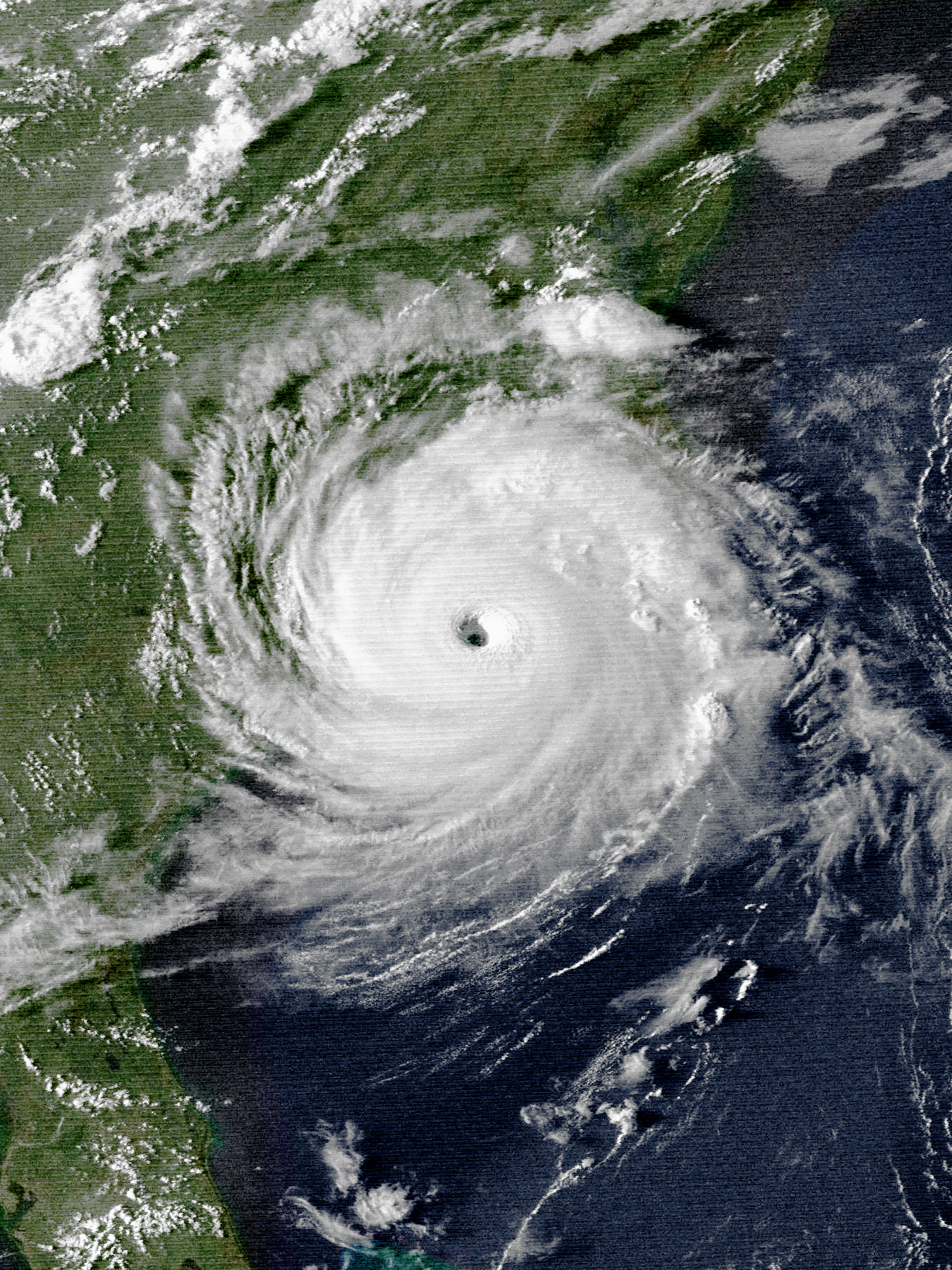
- Duration: September 8 – September 16
- Peak intensity: 130 mph (215 km/h) (1-min); 949 mbar (hPa)

On September 8, an extratropical cyclone organized into Tropical Storm Diana north of the Bahamas. Diana proved difficult for meteorologists to forecast, initially moving westward towards Cape Canaveral, but then turned to the north and paralleled the coastline. On September 11, the storm reached hurricane strength, and continued to intensify to a Category 4 hurricane, peaking with maximum sustained winds of 130 mph (215 km/h) and a minimum barometric pressure of 949 mbar (28.0 inHg). Diana moved north-northeast, and performed a small anti-cyclonic loop before making landfall near Cape Fear, North Carolina, as a Category 1 hurricane on September 13, with sustained winds at 90 mph. A weakened Diana curved back out to sea and headed northeast until it became extratropical near Newfoundland on September 16.

Severe beach erosion impacted Horry County, South Carolina, damaging 90 residences, 40 multi-family dwellings, 8 mobile homes, and a few businesses. In North Carolina, precipitation peaked at 18.98 in (482 mm) near Southport. Many areas in southeastern North Carolina reported freshwater flooding, with parts of Duplin, Pender, and Sampson counties experiencing 100-year flood events. High winds damaged some buildings and homes, especially in coastal areas of Brunswick and New Hanover counties. Throughout the state, Diana destroyed 68 homes and substantially damaged 325 others. Damage estimates were set at $65.5 million, with about $26.5 million of that figure dealt to agriculture. Six deaths, five due to indirect causes, occurred in relation to the storm. Diana became the first hurricane to strike a nuclear power plant — the Brunswick Nuclear Generating Station, which recorded sustained hurricane-force winds but no damage to the facility.

=== Tropical Storm Edouard ===
- Tropical storm (SSHWS)
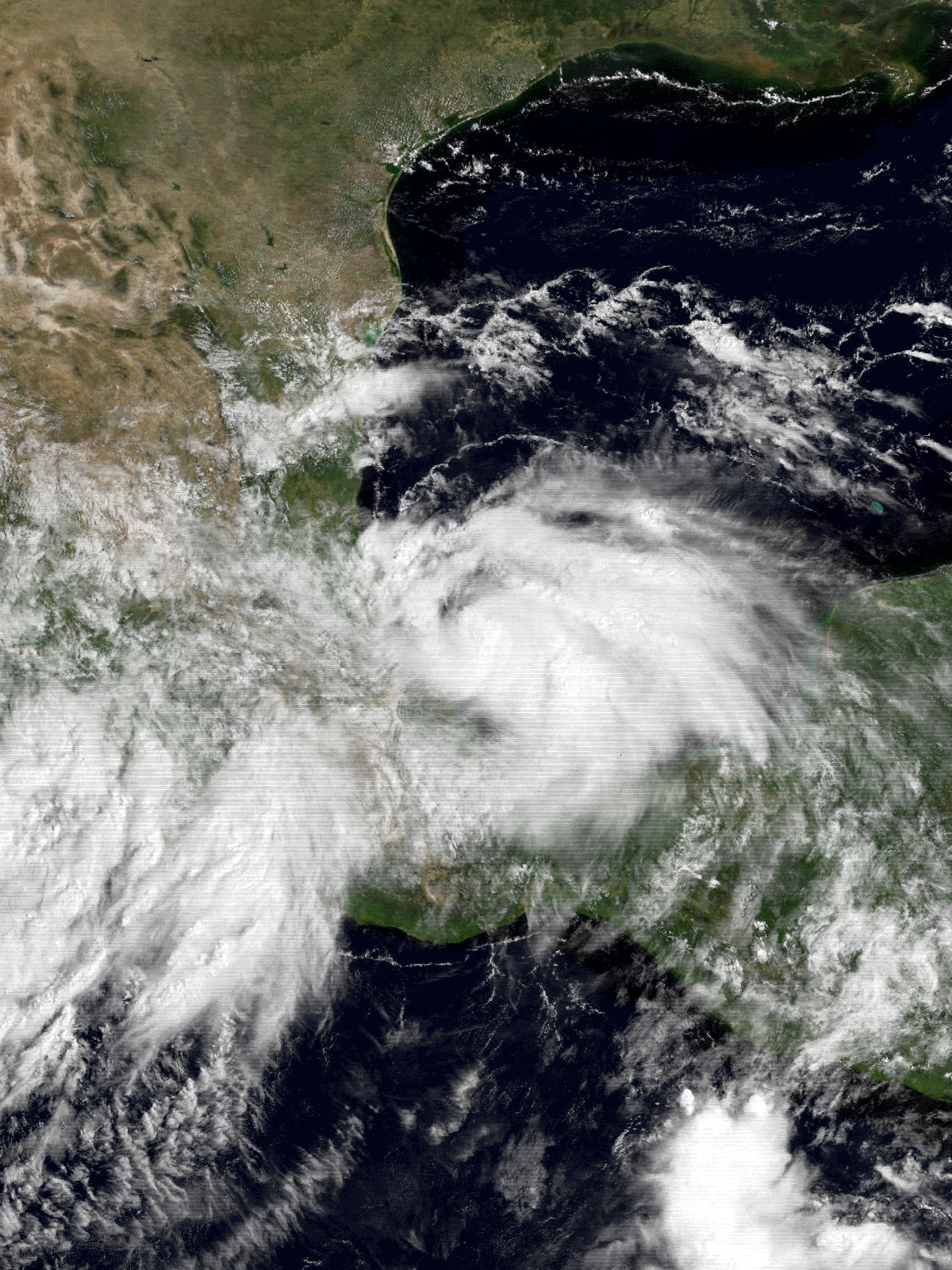
- Duration: September 14 – September 15
- Peak intensity: 65 mph (100 km/h) (1-min); 998 mbar (hPa)

The origins of Tropical Storm Edouard are unclear, but an area of persistent organized storms existed over the Gulf of Mexico for six or seven days prior to September 14 after a frontal system weakened. A tropical wave that crossed Central America on September 9 also enhanced convection. Based on a reconnaissance aircraft investigation, a tropical depression formed at 00:00 UTC on September 14 about 60 mi (95 km) east-southeast of Tecolutla, Veracruz. Despite westerly wind shear, the depression strengthened, becoming Tropical Storm Edouard six hours later and peaking with winds of 65 mph (100 km/h) and a barometric pressure of 998 mbar (29.5 inHg) early on September 15. Additionally, reconnaissance aircraft reported a small well-defined eye. However, Edouard then rapidly weakened, falling to tropical depression and then dissipating later that day about 60 mi (95 km) northeast of Veracruz, Veracruz. The remnants of Edouard produced heavy rains, sustained winds of 30 mph (50 km/h), and gusts up to 45 mph (70 km/h) in the city of Veracruz.

=== Tropical Storm Fran ===
- Tropical storm (SSHWS)
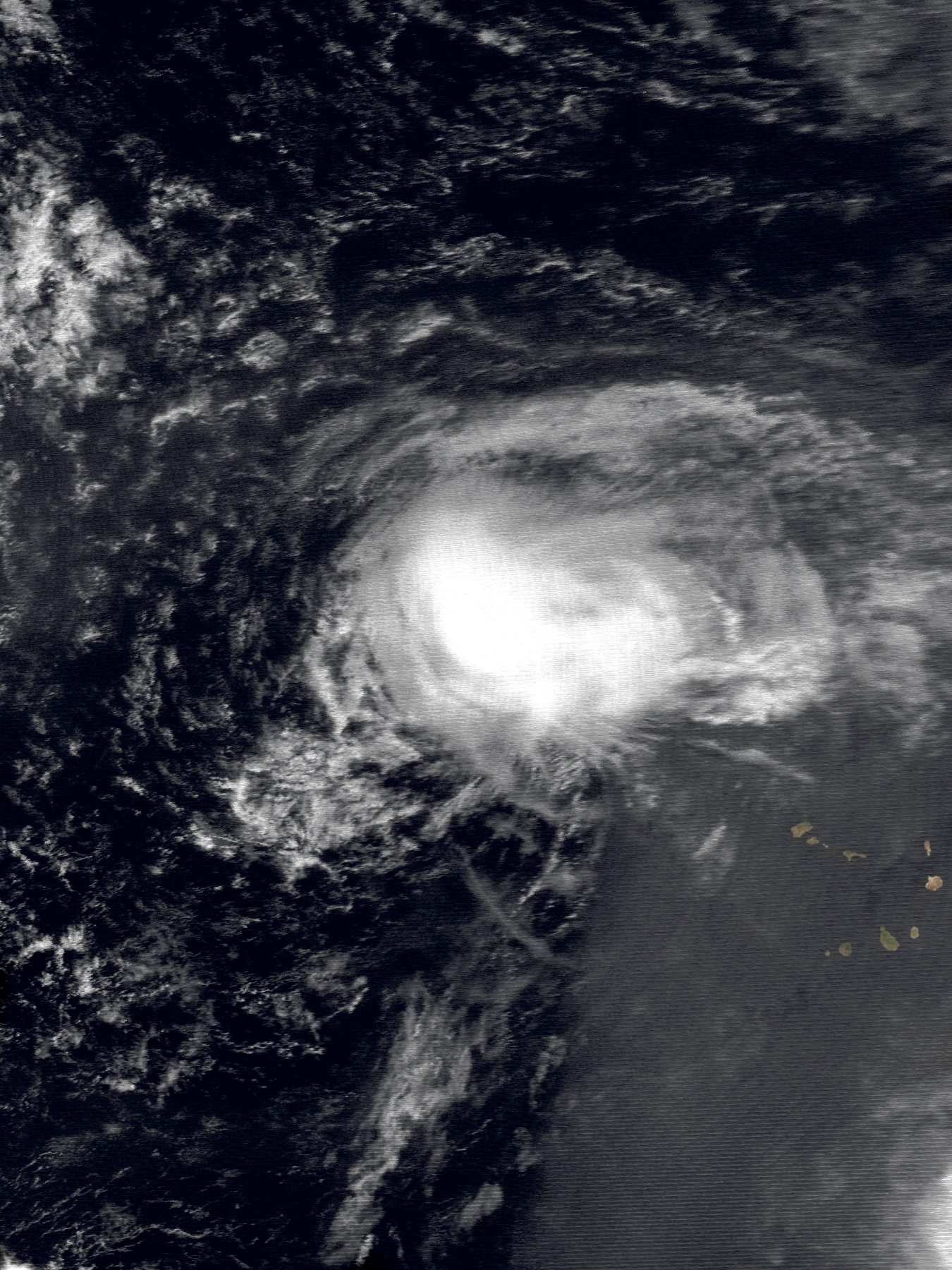
- Duration: September 15 – September 20
- Peak intensity: 65 mph (100 km/h) (1-min); 994 mbar (hPa)

On September 14, a well-defined tropical wave exited the coast of Africa. The next day, it had rapidly organized into a tropical depression. At 18:00 UTC on September 16, the depression attained tropical storm strength, and it was given the name Fran. It turned to the northwest, and passed very near the Cabo Verde Islands. Fran moved northwest to west-northwest on September 17–18 as it continued to organize. During this period satellite imagery indicated that Fran peaked with maximum sustained winds of 65 mph (105 km/h) and a minimum surface pressure of 994 mbar (29.35 inHg). Between September 19 and September 20, the cyclone turned westward and encountered strong upper-level wind shear, which caused Fran to dissipate on September 20.

As Fran passed the Cape Verde islands weather stations reported 35 mph (55 km/h) winds, leading to little wind damage, if any. However, torrential rainfall caused extensive flooding, severely damaging almost 1,100 dwellings and leaving at least 2,100 people homeless. Damage totaled approximately $2.84 million and 29-32 people died in the Cabo Verde Islands, making it the country's second-deadliest cyclone, behind only Hurricane Debbie in 1961.

=== Tropical Storm Gustav ===
- Tropical storm (SSHWS)
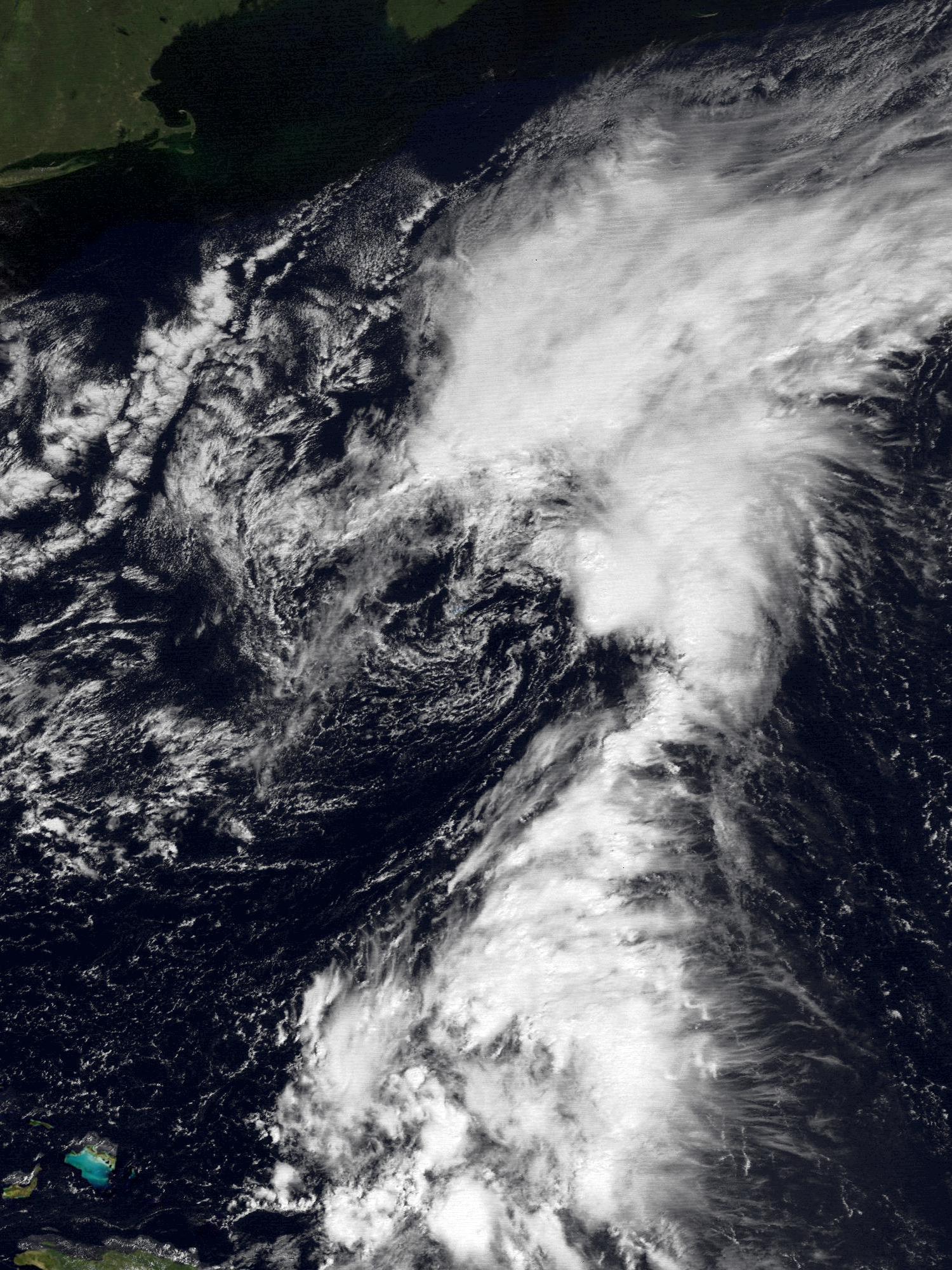
- Duration: September 16 – September 19
- Peak intensity: 50 mph (85 km/h) (1-min); 1006 mbar (hPa)

A tropical wave and an upper cold low interacted over the southwestern Atlantic in mid-September. Satellite and ship data led to the formation of a tropical depression late on September 16, then situated about 250 mi (400 km) south of Bermuda. The depression drifted northward due to an approaching cold front and passed near Bermuda late on September 17. About 24 hours later, a reconnaissance flight observed a barometric pressure of 1,006 mbar (29.7 inHg) and a ship recorded sustained winds of 45 mph (70 km/h), leading the depression to be upgraded to Tropical Storm Gustav, with winds of 50 mph (85 km/h). Falling pressures to the north and northeast of Gustav caused the storm to accelerate. Around 12:00 UTC on September 19, Gustav merged with a frontal system about 335 mi (540 km) northeast of Bermuda.

=== Hurricane Hortense ===
- Category 1 hurricane (SSHWS)
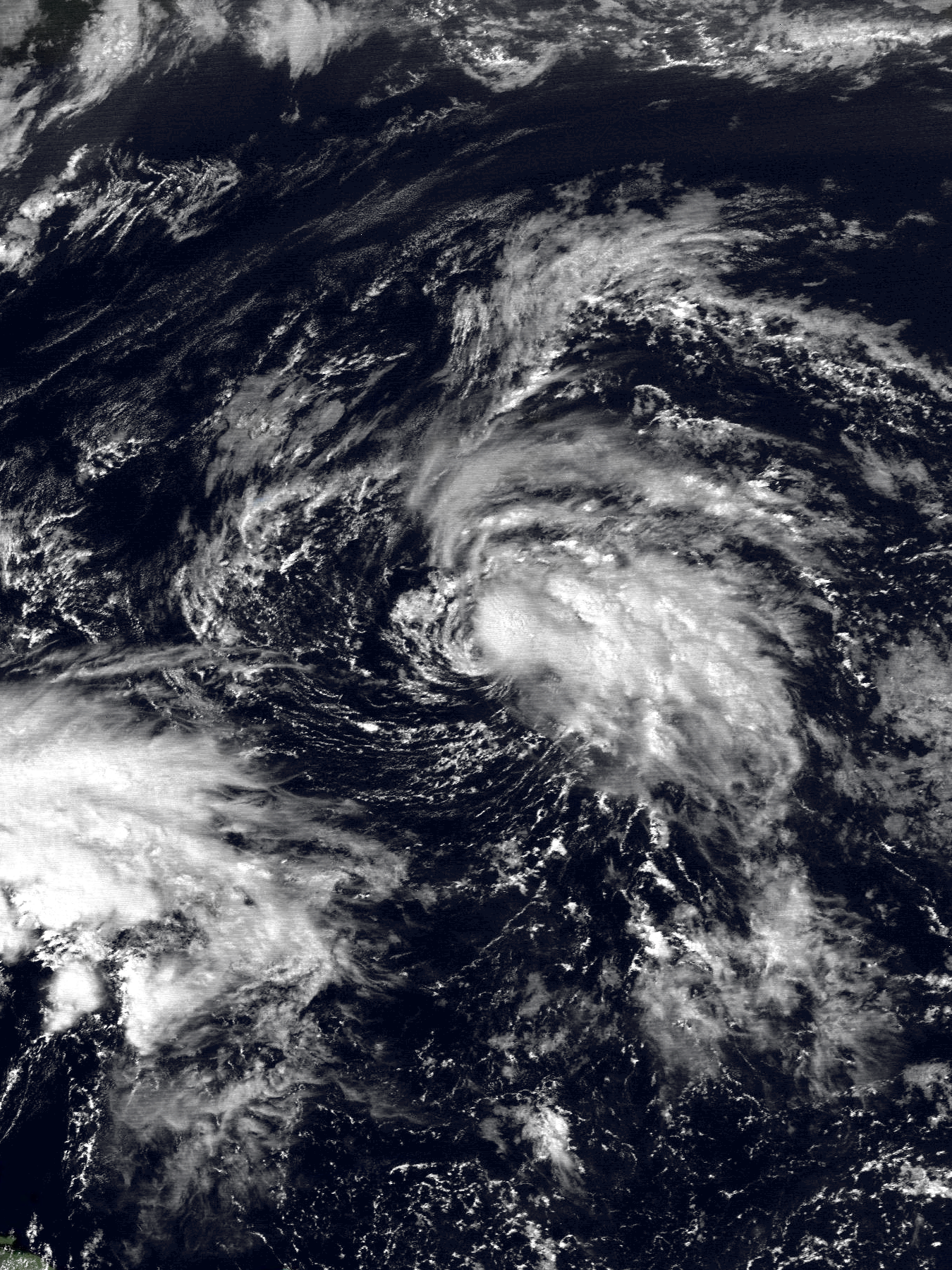
- Duration: September 23 – October 2
- Peak intensity: 75 mph (120 km/h) (1-min); 993 mbar (hPa)

A large frontal system spawned a subtropical depression early on September 23, about 385 mi (620 km) east of Bermuda. Ship and satellite data confirmed its development, and indicated the system intensified into a subtropical storm later on September 23. Initially the cyclone moved toward the south-southwest, although on September 24 it turned to the west. That day, the hurricane hunters reported that the system transitioned into a tropical cyclone; as such, it was named Tropical Storm Hortense. The newly-tropical storm quickly intensified while turning to the northwest, and late on September 25 Hortense attained hurricane status, about 300 mi (475 km) southeast of Bermuda.

Twelve hours after reaching hurricane status, Hortense began a sharp weakening trend while passing east of Bermuda. By September 27 it was a minimal tropical storm, and subsequently it executed a clockwise loop to the southwest. The intensity of Hortense fluctuated slightly over the subsequent few days, although it never regained its former intensity. On September 30, after turning to the west and later to the north, the storm passed just 7 miles (11 km) west of Bermuda. As the storm was so weak, the island only reported winds of 18 mph (29 km/h). Hortense accelerated to the northeast, moving rapidly across the North Atlantic before being absorbed by a larger extratropical storm late on October 2, northwest of the Azores.

=== Tropical Storm Isidore ===
- Tropical storm (SSHWS)
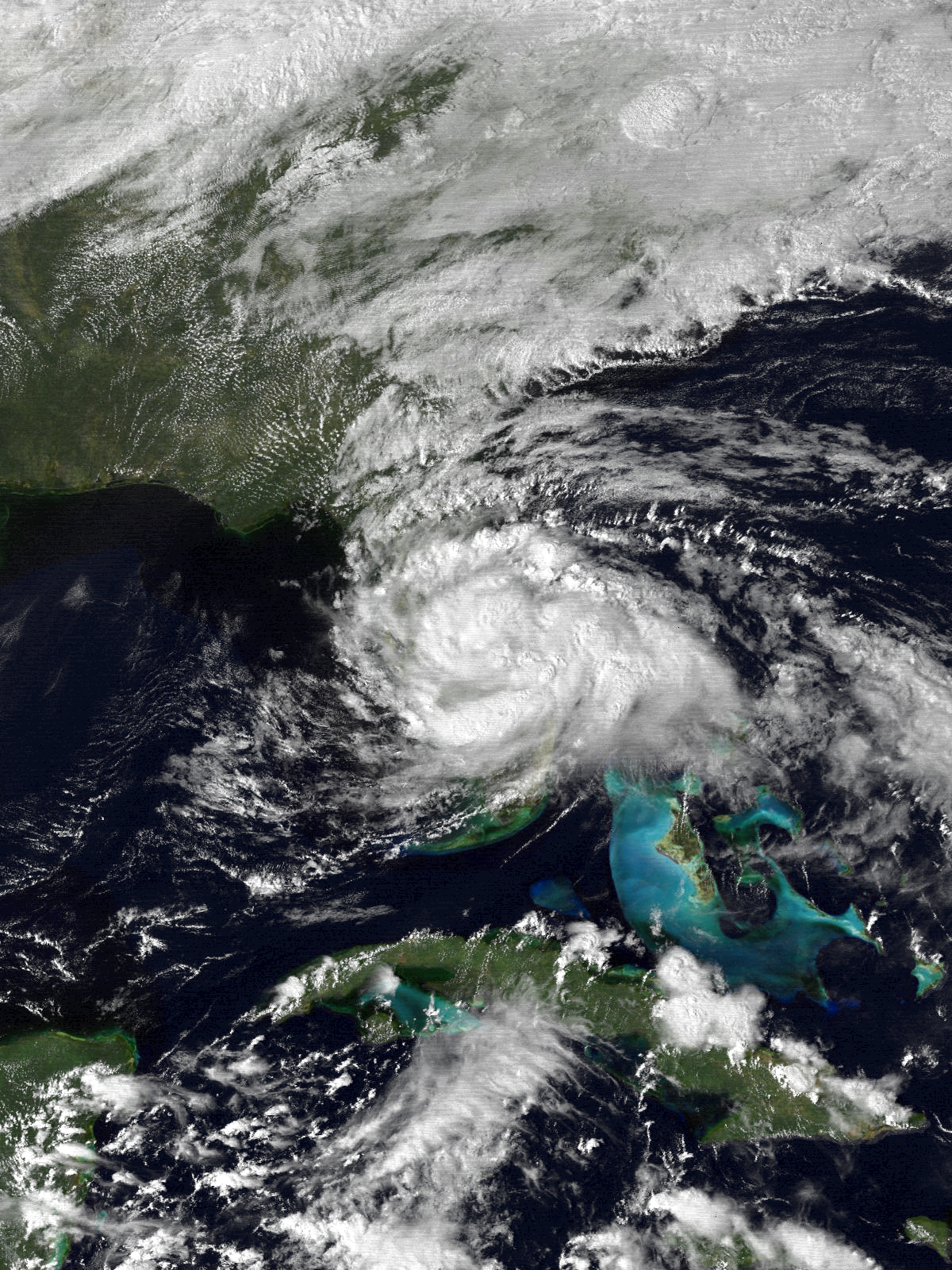
- Duration: September 25 – October 1
- Peak intensity: 60 mph (95 km/h) (1-min); 999 mbar (hPa)

On September 24, a disturbance formed along the western periphery of a semi-stationary frontal zone close to the Bahamas. This disturbance developed into a tropical depression around 12:00 UTC on September 25 near Samana Cay. Moving generally west-northwestward, the depression intensified into Tropical Storm Isidore about 24 hours later and passed near or over several Bahamian islands. Early on September 27, Isidore attained its lowest barometric pressure of 999 mbar (29.5 inHg) near Andros, shortly before peaking with sustained winds of 60 mph (95 km/h). Just after 1200 UTC that day, the cyclone made landfall near Jupiter, Florida. Retaining tropical storm strength, Isidore curved northeastward, emerging over water near Jacksonville, Florida. The system was absorbed by a front on October 1 about 330 mi (530 km) northeast of Bermuda.

Isidore produced heavy rains in the Bahamas, but no serious damage. High tides along the east coast of Florida caused beach erosion, damaged segments of State Road A1A, and damaged or destroyed sea turtle nests. Winds mainly only caused scattered power outages. However, one person died near Orlando after a live wire fell on his pickup truck. Total damages in Florida were estimated at over $750,000. Additionally, a tornado in Brunswick, Georgia, caused about $250,000 in damage.

=== Hurricane Josephine ===
- Category 2 hurricane (SSHWS)
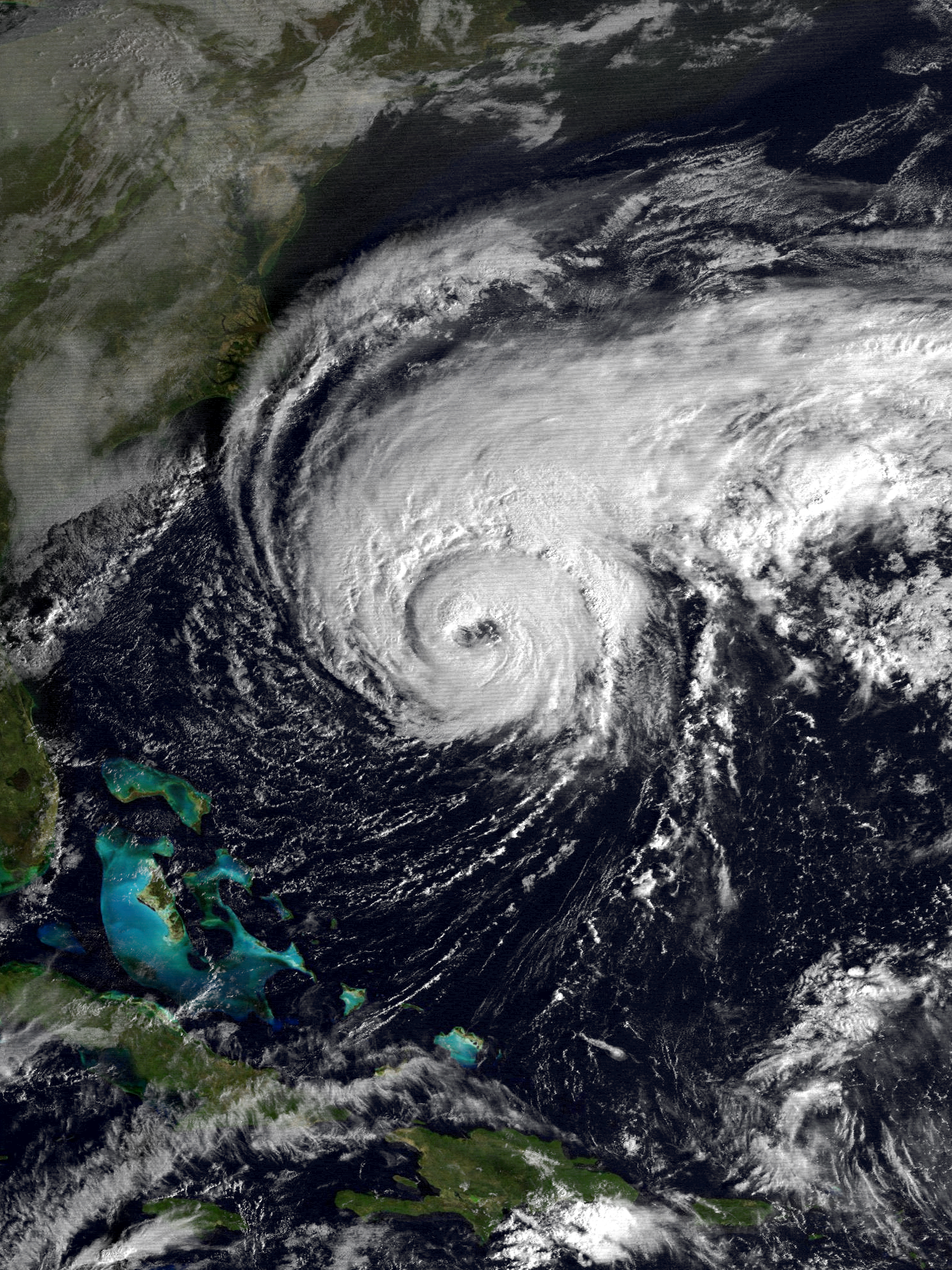
- Duration: October 7 – October 18
- Peak intensity: 105 mph (165 km/h) (1-min); 965 mbar (hPa)

In early October, an old frontal trough interacted with an upper-level low north of Hispaniola, leading to the formation of a subtropical depression about 235 mi (380 km) northeast of the Turks and Caicos Islands on October 7. The subtropical depression intensified and transitioned into Tropical Storm Josephine on October 8. The storm intensified into a hurricane on October 10 and peaked as a Category 2 hurricane with winds of 105 mph (165 km/h) on October 12. Moving generally northward, Josephine briefly jogged to the west, but turned southeastward on October 14 when it passed 36°N latitude (roughly level with Norfolk, Virginia). Turning northeast on October 15, Josephine's barometric pressure fell to 965 mbar (28.5 inHg) as it continued on this path until it made a cyclonic loop beginning on October 17. The cyclone became extratropical on October 19 about 125 mi (200 km) east of Sable Island, Nova Scotia and lost its identity on October 21.

While it stayed well away from the U.S. coast, Josephine was a large storm and sustained tropical storm winds were measured at the Diamond Shoals of Cape Hatteras. The hurricane caused wave damage to coastal areas, but primarily posed a threat to the shipping lanes of the North Atlantic. Offshore, a sailboat with six crewmen on it became disabled due to high waves, estimated to have exceeded 15 ft (4.6 m), produced by the hurricane. All of the people on the ship were quickly rescued after issuing a distress signal by a nearby tanker vessel. In Massachusetts, one man drowned after falling off his boat on the North River amidst large swells produced by the storm. In Long Island, New York and parts of New Jersey, tides between 2 and 4 ft (0.61 and 1.22 m) above normal resulted in minor coastal flooding.

=== October Tropical Depression ===
- Tropical depression (SSHWS)
- Duration: October 25 – October 28
- Peak intensity: 35 mph (55 km/h) (1-min); 1013 mbar (hPa)

This system was recognized as the seventeenth tropical depression of the season by the National Hurricane Center after the season ended. A retrograding upper-level low spurred the development of a low east of the Bahamas on October 25. The system tracked westward with limited shower and thunderstorm activity, crossing Florida on October 26 before moving into the Gulf of Mexico. Once the system moved into the north-central Gulf, deep convection began to develop near its center, expanding in intensity and coverage near and after landfall in extreme southeast Mississippi. The small system accelerated rapidly to the north and northeast ahead of an approaching cold front, moving across the Tennessee Valley and central Appalachians before linking up with the front and becoming a weak extratropical cyclone. The non-tropical cyclone then moved through coastal New England. The depression dropped rains across the eastern United States, though precipitation peaked at 4.83 in (123 mm) near Pascagoula, Mississippi.

=== Hurricane Klaus ===
- Category 1 hurricane (SSHWS)
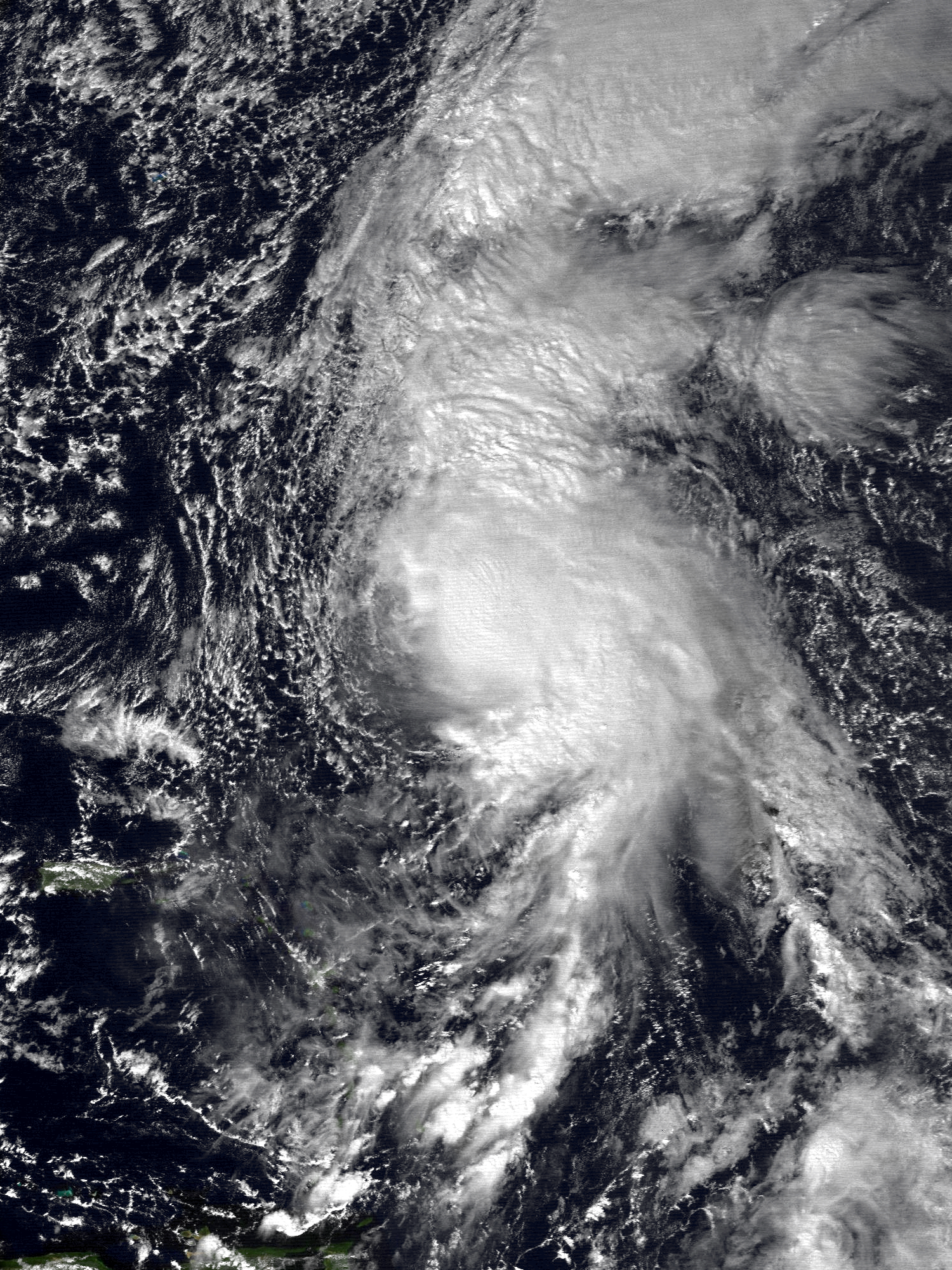
- Duration: November 5 – November 13
- Peak intensity: 90 mph (150 km/h) (1-min); 971 mbar (hPa)

A broad low formed over the eastern Caribbean on November 1, which developed into a tropical depression north of Curaçao on November 5. The cyclone maintained a northeast movement throughout much of its path and intensifed into Tropical Storm Klaus on the following day. After making landfall on extreme eastern Puerto Rico, it passed to the north of the Leeward Islands, resulting in strong southwesterly winds and rough seas. Klaus attained hurricane status on November 8 and peaked with maximum sustained winds of 90 mph (150 km/h) that day. The hurricane's barometric pressure decreased to 971 mbar (28.7 inHg) on November 11, before becoming extratropical over cooler waters two days later, then situated about 430 mi (690 km) southeast of Cape Race, Newfoundland.

The storm dropped heavy rainfall in Puerto Rico, causing numerous landslides, drowning one person, and damaging some homes and crops. Klaus inflicted heavy marine damage in the Leeward Islands, including wrecking at least three ships. Dominica reported two deaths and about $2 million in damage. Heavy damage occurred in the British Virgin Islands, totaling $152 million, while the United States Virgin Islands had about $3 million in damage.

=== November Tropical Depression ===
- Tropical depression (SSHWS)
- Duration: November 23 – November 28
- Peak intensity: 35 mph (55 km/h) (1-min); 1005 mbar (hPa)

On November 20, a quasi-stationary cold front extended from the northern Yucatán Peninsula to Grand Bahama. Several low pressure areas formed along the front, including one that developed into a tropical depression at 12:00 UTC on November 23 about 35 mi (55 km/h) east of Boynton Beach, Florida. The depression crossed the northern Bahamas and then moved out to sea, dissipating about 880 mi (1,415 km) east of Bermuda on November 28. There has been evidence that the November storm may have become a subtropical cyclone east of Bermuda. The cyclone contributed to the formation of a potent nor'easter.

Strong winds and abnormally high tides impacted the east coast of Florida from North Miami Beach to Fernandina Beach. Numerous homes, piers, and seawalls were damaged or destroyed, and at least 600 people were ordered to evacuate due to erosion. Heavy rains also fell, with West Palm Beach recording 7.41 in (188 mm) on November 22, a record for that calendar day. About 100 people evacuated from low-lying areas in Palm Beach County. Overall, the system caused at least $7.4 million in damage and one fatality.

=== Hurricane Lili ===
- Category 1 hurricane (SSHWS)
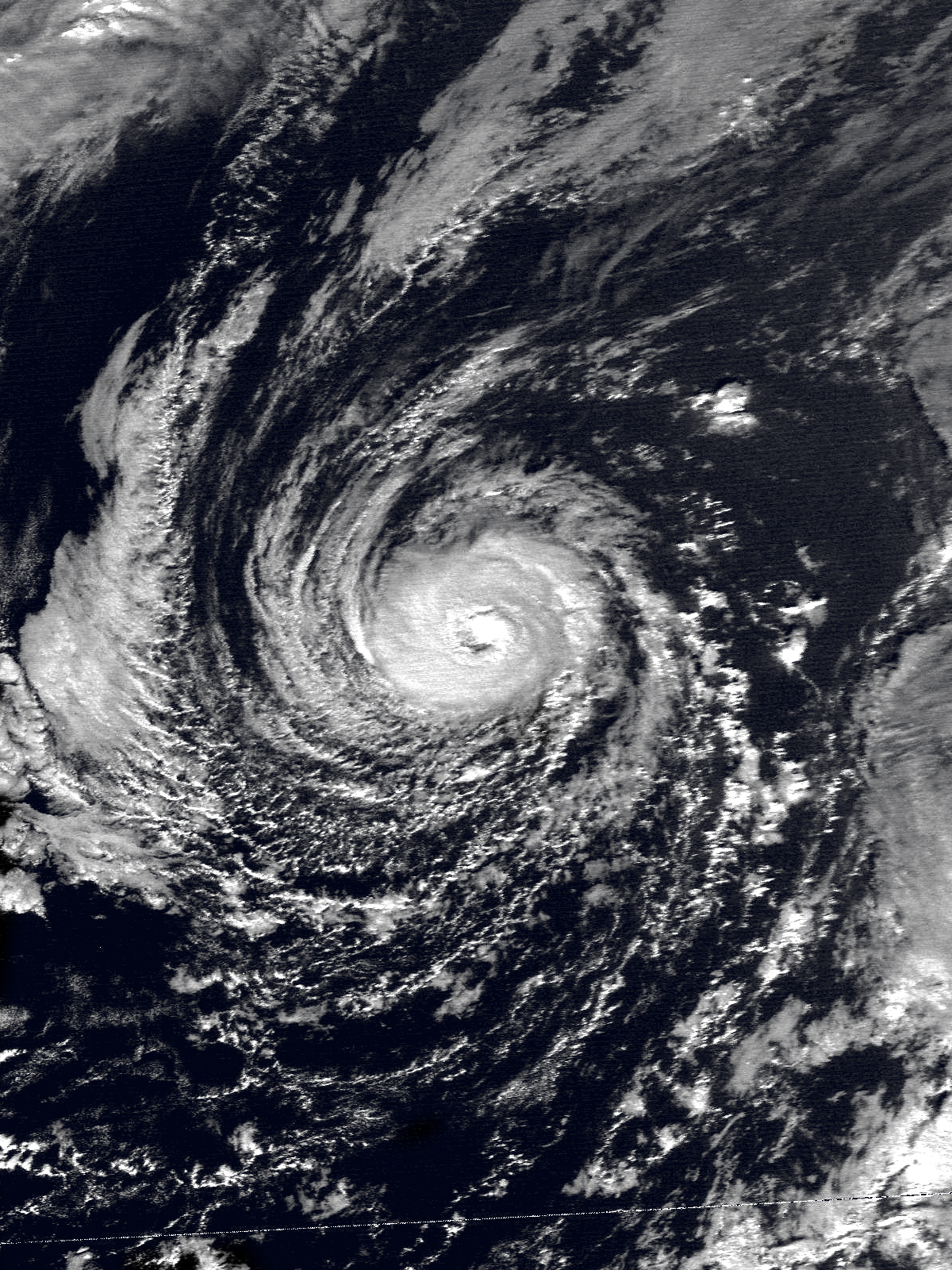
- Duration: December 12 – December 24
- Peak intensity: 80 mph (130 km/h) (1-min); 980 mbar (hPa)

In the second week of December, a frontal trough stalled south of Bermuda. An upper-level disturbance moved over the area on December 9, and produced widespread convection along the frontal wave. The system moved to the northeast, and based on a developing circulation within the convection, the NHC classified it as a subtropical cyclone on December 12 while located 275 mi (445 km) northeast of Bermuda. A day later, a ridge forced the storm to the southeast and later to the south for a few days. A break in the ridge allowed the storm to turn back to the northeast on December 16, followed by a turn northwestward a day later. Another ridge halted the storm's movement, turning it back to the southwest on December 18, and later to the south. During this time, the subtropical storm intensified, with satellite-estimated hurricane-force winds by December 19. On the next day, a nearby ship recorded winds of 72 mph (117 km/h), along with a minimum pressure of 982 mbar (29.0 inHg). Based on the observations, as well as the appearance of a well-defined eye, the NHC reclassified the storm as Hurricane Lili on December 20, estimating peak winds of 80 mph (130 km/h) and a pressure of 980 mbar (29 inHg). At the time, Lili was located about 730 mi (1,175 km) east of Bermuda. Lili was only one of six Atlantic hurricanes on record during the month of December.

After becoming a tropical cyclone, Lili accelerated to the southwest, completing a large cyclonic loop by December 22, after crossing over the same location one week prior. That day, a hurricane watch was issued for Puerto Rico and the Virgin Islands on December 22. However, Lili weakened due to increased wind shear, degrading to a tropical storm on December 23 while 430 mi (690 km) northeast of Antigua. The storm rapidly lost organization as it approached the Leeward Islands, dissipating near the northern coast of the Dominican Republic on December 24. The storm brought light rainfall to the region.

== Storm names ==
The following list of names was used for named storms that formed in the North Atlantic in 1984. Most names were used for the first time, except for Bertha and Fran, which were previously used under previous naming conventions. No names were retired following the season, so the list was used again in the 1990 season.

- Arthur
- Bertha
- Cesar
- Diana
- Edouard
- Fran
- Gustav
- Hortense
- Isidore
- Josephine
- Klaus
- Lili
- Marco (unused)
- Nana (unused)
- Omar (unused)
- Paloma (unused)
- Rene (unused)
- Sally (unused)
- Teddy (unused)
- Vicky (unused)
- Wilfred (unused)

== Season effects ==
This is a table of all of the storms that formed in the 1984 Atlantic hurricane season. It includes their name, duration, peak classification and intensities, areas affected, damage, and death totals. Deaths in parentheses are additional and indirect (an example of an indirect death would be a traffic accident), but were still related to that storm. Damage and deaths include totals while the storm was extratropical, a wave, or a low, and all of the damage figures are in 1984 USD.

Saffir–Simpson scale
TD	TS	C1	C2	C3	C4	C5

Name	Dates	Peak intensity			Areas affected	Damage (USD)	Deaths	Ref(s).
Name	Dates	Category	Wind speed	Pressure	Areas affected	Damage (USD)	Deaths	Ref(s).
One	June 11–14	Tropical depression	35 miles per hour (55 km/h)	1016 hPa (29.88 inHg)	Florida	None	None	
Two	June 18–20	Tropical depression	35 miles per hour (55 km/h)	1008 hPa (29.77 inHg)	northern Mexico	None	None	
Three	July 25–26	Tropical depression	35 miles per hour (55 km/h)	1000 hPa (29.53 inHg)	None	None	None	
Unnumbered	August 6–8	Tropical depression	35 miles per hour (55 km/h)	Unknown	None	None	None	
One	August 18–21	Subtropical storm	60 miles per hour (95 km/h)	1000 hPa (29.53 inHg)	None	None	None	
Arthur	August 28 – September 5	Tropical storm	50 miles per hour (80 km/h)	1004 hPa (29.65 inHg)	None	None	None	
Bertha	August 30 – September 4	Tropical storm	40 miles per hour (65 km/h)	1007 hPa (29.74 inHg)	None	None	None	
Cesar	August 31 – September 2	Tropical storm	60 miles per hour (95 km/h)	994 hPa (29.35 inHg)	None	None	None	
Seven	September 6–8	Tropical depression	35 miles per hour (55 km/h)	Unknown	northern Mexico	None	None	
Diana	September 8–16	Category 4 hurricane	130 miles per hour (210 km/h)	949 hPa (28.02 inHg)	Southeastern United States, Atlantic Canada	$65.5 million	1 (5)	
Edouard	September 14–15	Tropical storm	65 miles per hour (105 km/h)	998 hPa (29.47 inHg)	northern Mexico	None	None	
Fran	September 15–20	Tropical storm	65 miles per hour (105 km/h)	994 hPa (28.35 inHg)	Cape Verde Islands	$2.8 million	29–32	
Gustav	September 16–19	Tropical storm	50 miles per hour (80 km/h)	1006 hPa (29.71 inHg)	Bermuda	None	None	
Hortense	September 23 – October 2	Category 1 hurricane	75 miles per hour (120 km/h)	993 hPa (29.32 inHg)	None	None	None	
Isidore	September 25 – October 1	Tropical storm	60 miles per hour (95 km/h)	999 hPa (29.50 inHg)	Bahamas, Southeastern United States	$1 million	0 (1)	
Josephine	October 7–18	Category 2 hurricane	105 miles per hour (169 km/h)	965 hPa (28.50 inHg)	East Coast of the United States	Minor	1	
Unnumbered	October 25–28	Tropical depression	35 miles per hour (55 km/h)	1013 hPa (29.91 inHg)	Southeastern United States	None	None	
Klaus	November 5–13	Category 1 hurricane	90 miles per hour (145 km/h)	971 hPa (28.67 inHg)	Puerto Rico, Leeward Islands	$157 million	3	
Unnumbered	November 23–28	Tropical depression	35 miles per hour (55 km/h)	1005 hPa (29.68 inHg)	Bahamas, Florida, Bermuda	$7.4 million	1	
Lili	December 12–24	Category 1 hurricane	80 miles per hour (130 km/h)	980 hPa (28.94 inHg)	Puerto Rico, Hispaniola	None	None	
Season aggregates
20 systems	June 11 – December 24		130 miles per hour (210 km/h)	949 hPa (28.02 inHg)		$233.74 million	41–44	

== See also ==
- 1984 Pacific hurricane season
- 1984 Pacific typhoon season
- 1984 North Indian Ocean cyclone season
- Australian cyclone seasons: 1983–84, 1984–85
- South Pacific cyclone seasons: 1983–84, 1984–85
- South-West Indian Ocean cyclone seasons: 1983–84, 1984–85
- South Atlantic tropical cyclone
- Mediterranean tropical-like cyclone
