= 1996 hurricane season =

1996 hurricane season may refer to:

- The 1996 Atlantic hurricane season
- The 1996 Pacific hurricane season
