= List of storms named Klaus =

The name Klaus has been used for two tropical cyclones and one extratropical cyclone worldwide.

== Tropical cyclones ==
In the Atlantic Ocean:

- Hurricane Klaus (1984), formed in the eastern Caribbean Sea, caused damage in the Leeward and Virgin Islands.
- Hurricane Klaus (1990), formed east of Dominica, caused damage in the Lesser Antilles, Saint Lucia and Martinique, with fatalities in Martinique, with remnants of Klaus causing fatalities in South Carolina.

The name Klaus was retired after the 1990 season because of the extensive damage and loss of life caused by the storm and was replaced with Kyle for the 1996 season.

== Extratropical cyclones ==
In Europe's windstorm naming system:

- Cyclone Klaus (2009), caused substantial damage in Spain and France with at least 23 fatalities reported.
