= Hurricane Klaus (1990) =

Category 1 Atlantic hurricane in 1990

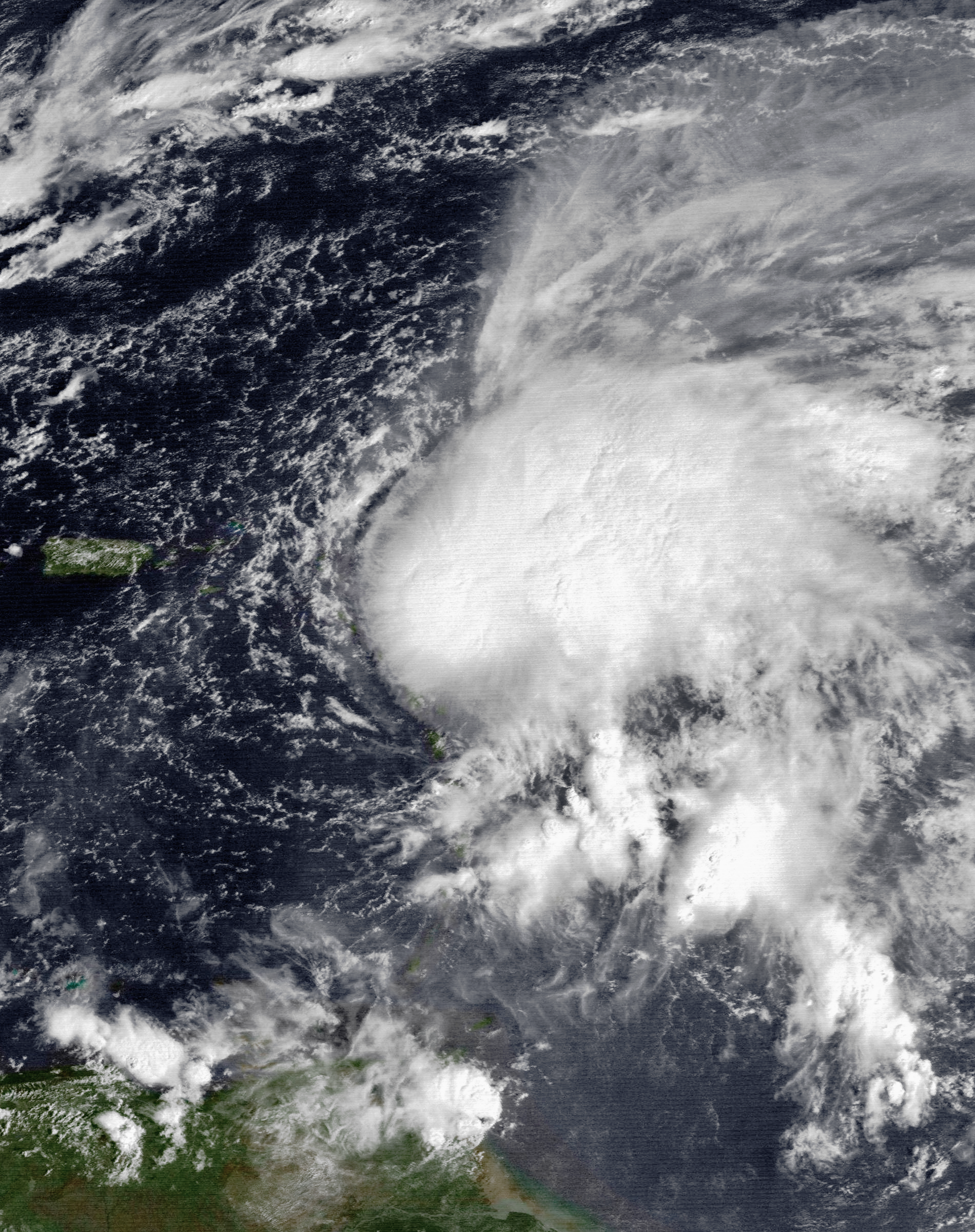
- Hurricane Klaus over the Leeward Islands on October 5

Meteorological history
- Formed: October 3, 1990
- Dissipated: October 9, 1990

Category 1 hurricane
- 1-minute sustained (SSHWS/NWS)
- Highest winds: 80 mph (130 km/h)
- Lowest pressure: 985 mbar (hPa); 29.09 inHg

Overall effects
- Fatalities: 11 direct
- Damage: >$1 million (1990 USD)
- Areas affected: Lesser Antilles; Lucayan Archipelago; Southeastern United States
- IBTrACS
- Part of the 1990 Atlantic hurricane season

Hurricane Klaus was a minimal tropical cyclone that dropped heavy rainfall across the Lesser Antilles in October 1990. The eleventh tropical cyclone and sixth hurricane of the 1990 Atlantic hurricane season, Klaus developed from a tropical wave on October 3 a short distance east of Dominica. It drifted northwestward, and quickly intensified to attain hurricane status on October 5. Though its closest approach to the Lesser Antilles was within 12 miles (19 km), the strongest winds remained to its northeast due to strong wind shear, which caused Klaus to steadily weaken. After deteriorating into a tropical depression, Klaus briefly restrengthened over the Bahamas before dissipating on October 9 under the influence of developing Tropical Storm Marco.

Heavy rainfall on Saint Lucia destroyed about 15% of its yearly banana crop. Damage was heaviest on Martinique, where seven casualties occurred and 1,500 people were left homeless as the heavy rainfall caused severe flooding on the island, resulting in some landslides. The remnant moisture of Klaus entered the southeastern United States, dropping heavy rainfall and causing four casualties; the same area was affected with more precipitation a few days later by Tropical Storm Marco. Due to the impact Klaus had on Martinique, the name Klaus was retired from the list of tropical cyclone names.

== Meteorological history ==
Map plotting the storm's track and intensity, according to the Saffir–Simpson scale Map key Saffir–Simpson scale Tropical depression (≤38 mph, ≤62 km/h) Tropical storm (39–73 mph, 63–118 km/h) Category 1 (74–95 mph, 119–153 km/h) Category 2 (96–110 mph, 154–177 km/h) Category 3 (111–129 mph, 178–208 km/h) Category 4 (130–156 mph, 209–251 km/h) Category 5 (≥157 mph, ≥252 km/h) Unknown Storm type Tropical cyclone Subtropical cyclone Extratropical cyclone, remnant low, tropical disturbance, or monsoon depression

A tropical wave moved off the coast of Africa on September 27. It tracked westward to the south of a subtropical ridge, becoming convectively active, and a low-level circulation was observed as it passed south of the Cape Verde islands on September 28. The organization of the convection oscillated over the subsequent days, and a few times the system showed signs of developing into a tropical depression. As it approached the Lesser Antilles it organized further, and despite unfavorable upper-level wind shear the system developed into Tropical Depression Thirteen on October 3 while located about 115 miles (185 km)/h) east of Dominica. Located in an area of weak steering currents, the depression drifted to the northwest, and about six hours after first developing the cyclone intensified into a tropical storm; the National Hurricane Center designated it with the name Klaus.

Upon becoming a tropical storm, Klaus was located in an area of 29 mph (47 km/h) of wind shear, although concurrently it was located over warm water temperatures of 83.1 °F (28.4 °C). As it tracked through a highly baroclinic environment, Klaus became more organized and intensified into a hurricane at 12:00 UTC on October 5, 25 nautical miles (29 mi; 46 km) east of Antigua. Soon after, it passed 10 nautical miles (12 mi; 19 km) east of Barbuda, its closest point of approach to the Leeward Islands. Klaus reached peak winds of 80 mph (130 km/h) and a minimum central pressure of 985.0 mbar (29.09 inHg), though most of its deep convection and strong winds remained to its northeast due to wind shear. At the time the hurricane was forecasted to continue tracking to the north-northwest. However, after weakening to a tropical storm on October 6, Klaus turned westward.

Klaus continued tracking just north of the Lesser Antilles, and after continuing to deteriorate from the wind shear, the cyclone weakened to a tropical depression on October 8 to the north of Puerto Rico. Later that day, convection redeveloped over the center, and Klaus re-attained tropical storm status as it accelerated toward the northeast Bahamas; it briefly reached winds of 50 mph (80 km/h). A low pressure area to its west over Cuba had been steadily intensifying and building toward the surface, and on October 9 it developed into a tropical depression; the cyclone became the dominant system, eventually becoming Marco, and Klaus dissipated under the influence of the system late on October 9. The remnant moisture continued to the northwest, reaching the coast of South Carolina by October 11.

== Preparations ==
Shortly after Klaus attained tropical storm status early on October 4, a tropical storm warning was issued for the northern Leeward Islands from Saint Martin to Antigua, which was upgraded to a hurricane warning as its quick strengthening became apparent; additionally, the government of France issued a tropical storm warning for Guadeloupe. A hurricane watch was issued for the Virgin Islands, though it was dropped as Klaus began to weaken. In Guadeloupe, officials advised citizens to transport livestock to safer areas, and also to avoid potentially flooded areas. Prior to its arrival, schools were closed in Martinique, Sint Maarten, and Antigua. The VC Bird International Airport was closed during the passage of the hurricane.

Later in its duration, the government of the Bahamas issued a tropical storm warning for the central and later northern Bahamas, though it was discontinued as the cyclone dissipated. Due to Hurricane Klaus, Space Shuttle Columbia's launch was delayed.

== Impact ==
Hurricane Klaus dropped moderate to heavy rainfall across the Lesser Antilles, potentially as high as 15 inches (380 mm); the hurricane affected many areas struck by Hurricane Hugo in the previous year. On Barbados, flooding from the rainfall blocked a few roads and forced a few families to move to safer areas; lightning from the outskirts of the storm left a portion of the island without power. High winds and rainfall affected the island of Saint Lucia, which destroyed about 15% of the nation's banana crop for the year; damage totaled about $1 million (1990 USD).

The rainfall resulted in severe flooding on Martinique, which accrued to almost 10 feet (3.0 m) in some locations; two sisters drowned near Saint-Joseph after a bridge was washed away. Several landslides were reported on the island. The passage of the cyclone left damaged and power and telephone systems. 750 people evacuated their homes in Le Lamentin due to flooding, and a total of 1,500 residents were left homeless on the island. Offshore, rough conditions damaged a fishing vessel, leaving its two passengers drifting on the boat for 25 days before being rescued about 640 miles (1,030 km) to the north-northwest of Martinique. In all, seven people were killed on the island.

On Dominica, winds from the hurricane damaged power lines and downed trees in the northern portion of the island. High winds on Antigua damaged a few roofs, and also downed communications from two radio networks. The outer rainbands of the storm dropped light rainfall on the United States Virgin Islands, reaching about 1.25 inches (32 mm) on Saint Thomas; wind gusts peaked at 33 mph (53 km/h) on Saint Croix. Moderate rainfall continued into the Turks and Caicos Islands, with Grand Turk reporting a total of 4 inches (100 mm) in 36 hours.

On the east coast of Florida, Klaus produced 15 feet (4.6 m) waves and tides of 3 feet (0.91 m) above normal. Beach erosion was reported along the east coast, due to persistent easterly winds. As the remnant moisture of Klaus entered the southeastern United States, it produced heavy rainfall between 10 and 15 inches (254 and 381 millimetres) of rainfall in South Carolina, with slightly lower totals in North Carolina. In South Carolina, the rainfall caused a dam to burst, killing four people. About two days after the remnants of Klaus entered the southeastern United States, Tropical Storm Marco made landfall on northwestern Florida, dropping more heavy rainfall and causing heavy damage across the region.

== Retirement ==
Due to the storm's impacts on the islands of the Lesser Antilles, the World Meteorological Organization retired the name Klaus from the Atlantic hurricane name lists following the 1990 season. It was replaced with Kyle for the 1996 season.

== See also ==
- Other storms with the same name
- List of North Carolina hurricanes (1980–1999)
- List of retired Atlantic hurricane names
