= Tzucacab =

Town in the Mexican state of Yucatán

- Municipal seat
- Location within Yucatán (state)
- Coordinates: 20°04′15″N 89°03′02″W
- Country: Mexico
- State: Yucatán
- Municipality: Tzucacab
- Elevation: 36 m (118 ft)

Population (2010)
  - Total: 9,967

Tzucacab is a town and the municipal seat of the Tzucacab Municipality in Yucatán, Mexico. It gained prominence for being the site where the Treaty of Tzucacab was signed, an attempt to end the brutal Caste War of Yucatán that began in the Yucatán Peninsula in 1847. This conflict persisted until 1901 when Mexican federal troops finally reclaimed the last strongholds from indigenous Maya rebels, specifically Bacalar and Chan Santa Cruz in what is now the state of Quintana Roo.

== Toponymy ==
The name "Tzucacab" means "small part of the town" in the Mayan language, derived from the words "tsukul" (portion or part) and "kaaj" (town or hill).

== Location ==
Tzucacab is located 15 km southwest of Peto and 30 km southeast of Tekax, approximately 145 km southeast of Mérida, the capital of Yucatán.

== Historic background ==
Tzucacab is situated in the former territory of the Cochuah chiefdom (kuchkabal), with Chunhuhub as its capital. Archaeological evidence indicates that the area was inhabited before the Spanish conquest of Yucatán. Although the exact date of the town's founding is unknown, an Encomienda was established by around 1612. Following Yucatán's independence and its subsequent annexation to Mexico, Tzucacab became part of the Partido de Beneficios Altos, with Tihosuco as the district's head.

In 1848, the Treaty of Tzucacab was signed in the town between Jacinto Pat, a Maya batab, and Miguel Barbachano, the political leader of Yucatán at the time. This treaty sought, unsuccessfully, to end the Caste War

== Population ==
Year	Residents
2000	12,577
2005	13,564
2010	14,011
2020	15,346
