= Alpuche =

Alpuche is a surname. Notable people with the surname include:

- Abraham Alpuche (born 1987), Mexican footballer
- Celia Mercedes Alpuche Aranda (born 1956), Mexican medical doctor
- Graciliano Alpuche Pinzón, Governor of Yucatán, Mexico, from 1982 to 1984
- José María Alpuche (1780–1840), Mexican priest and politician
- Wenceslao Alpuche (1804–1841), Mexican poet and politician
- Yolanda Noemí Alpuche Morales (1929–2012; known as Yolanda Mérida), Mexican actress
