= Chacsinkín Municipality =

Municipality in the Mexican state of Yucatán

Chacsinkín
- Municipality
- Region 6 Oriente #016

- Location of the Municipality in Mexico
- Coordinates: 20°10′21″N 89°00′58″W
- Country: Mexico
- State: Yucatán
- Mexico Ind.: 1821
- Yucatán Est.: 1824

Government
  - Type: 2012–2015
  - Municipal President: Gloria Jesús Mukul Borges

Area
  - Total: 158.40 km^{2} (61.16 sq mi)
- Elevation: 33 m (108 ft)

Population (2010)
  - Total: 2,818
  - Density: 17.79/km^{2} (46.08/sq mi)
  - Demonym: Umanense
- Time zone: UTC-6 (Central Standard Time)
- INEGI Code: 016
- Major Airport: Merida (Manuel Crescencio Rejón) International Airport
- IATA Code: MID
- ICAO Code: MMMD

Chacsinkín Municipality (Yucatec Maya: "firewood reddened by time or plant of the red flowers") is a municipality in the Mexican state of Yucatán containing 158.40 km^{2} of land and is located roughly 120 kilometres (75 mi) southeast of the city of Mérida.

== History ==
There is no accurate data on when the town was founded, but it was a settlement before the conquest and a part of the chieftainship of Tutul Xiú. After colonization, the area became part of the encomienda system with Lorenzo de Ávila Carranza and Isabel de la Cerda serving as encomenderos in 1704.

Yucatán declared its independence from the Spanish Crown in 1821, and in 1825 the area was assigned to the High Sierra partition with headquarters in Tekax Municipality. In 1867, it was moved to the jurisdiction of the Peto Municipality. It was transferred again to the Tzucacab Municipality in 1910 and finally became its own municipality in 1918.

== Governance ==
The municipal president is elected for a three-year term. The town council has four councilpersons, who serve as Secretary and councilors of public works, education and health, recruitment and potable water.

The Municipal Council administers the business of the municipality. It is responsible for budgeting and expenditures and producing all required reports for all branches of the municipal administration. Annually it determines educational standards for schools.

The Police Commissioners ensure public order and safety. They are tasked with enforcing regulations, distributing materials and administering rulings of general compliance issued by the council.

== Communities ==
The head of the municipality is Chacsinkín, Yucatán. The municipality has 10 populated places besides the seat including Chimay Mul, Sabacché, Sisbic, Xbox and X-cohil. The significant populations are shown below:

Community	Population
Entire Municipality (2010)	2,818
Chacsinkín	2300 in 2005
X'box	209 in 2005

== Local festivals ==
Every year on 12 June, there is a festival in honor of Saint Anthony of Padua.

== Tourist attractions ==
- Church of Saint Peter, built during the seventeenth century
