= Community Agroecology Network Alternative Spring Break =

Alternative Spring Break (ASB) is a program based in UC Santa Cruz that provides a cultural exchange for students and contemporary Maya communities in Tzucacab, Yucatán, Mexico. The purpose of the program is to give students exposure to a distinct way of life. Alternative Spring Break accepts applications in the Winter Quarter, then travels to the Yucatán during Spring Break.

== History ==
ASB is an Action Education International Field Course hosted by the Community Agroecology Network (CAN). CAN is a non-profit community-based organization founded in 2002, headquartered at the base of the campus of the University of California, Santa Cruz. The organization was created in response to the coffee crisis that occurred in Central America and in Mexico in the 80’s; it seeks to confront injustice by providing alternative and community based approaches to sustainable living. Community Agroecology Network seeks to maintain rural livelihoods and sustainable food systems using the Freirean approach of the Subject-Subject relationship. Paulo Freire is a Brazilian philosopher and activist who, until his untimely death in 1997, worked internationally towards social change. His works, including Pedagogy of the Oppressed, focus on popular education and liberation of the historically oppressed. CAN’s approach to maintaining its principles in confronting injustices include incorporating the philosophy of Freire into ASB. CAN’s programs include Participatory Action Research, Trade Innovations, and Action Education. ASB has been active since 2008.

== Functions ==
ASB is an Action Education International Field Course under CAN that offers students at UC Santa Cruz a cultural exchange experience with contemporary Maya families in Tzucacab, Yucatán, México. During ASB, students from UC Santa Cruz stay with a host family, the families provide the students a place to stay throughout the week while they participate in activities with the rest of the group of students. On one of the first days, the students participate in a Mayan ceremony called Wajikol. Wajikol, which means “the bread of the milpa”, is a ceremony to give thanks to the earth for the harvest. Other activities include visiting Mayan ruins, such as Chichen Itza and the wonders of Yucatán’s cenotes. Cenotes are underground water caves where rainfall accumulates. Cenotes were once believed to be the gateway into the afterlife, and were used as the site for sacrificial offerings.

== Geographical reach ==
Community Agroecology Network works alongside communities in Nicaragua, El Salvador, Costa Rica, and Mexico and offers Field Study and Field Courses in Nicaragua, Costa Rica, and Mexico. Alternative Spring Break (ASB) is offered in Yucatán, Mexico. Tzucacab is located in the Tzucacab Municipality in the state of Yucatán, with a population of about 14,000 in 2010. A little more than half of Tzucacab is employed in the agriculture sector. Similar trips are offered to Costa Rica in July to learn about agroecology and sustainable development; Another trip is offered in February to learn about the process of how Agrocoffee is made in Nicaragua.

== AgroEco coffee ==
AgroEco coffee is a product of the Community Agroecology Network; it typifies the collaborative local approach to sustainable development. Agrocoffee is the result of the long-term relationships CAN has nurtured with several communities in Latin America. In confronting economic injustices, CAN has worked together with coffee growers to develop an alternative and community based approach to sustainable living. The Field Research program offered in Nicaragua offers students the opportunity to learn about the landscape, the people and the process in which Agrocoffee is made.

== Long-term impact ==
ASB is possible because of the relationships that have been established through CAN. Researchers, farmers, students, and community members make up the network of collaborators who promote food security, food sovereignty, agroecology, and interculturality. ASB gives both the students and the community exposure to a different culture and a different way of life so that they can learn from one another. According to Freire, before there can exist progress between two communities there must exist a teacher-student, student-teacher relationship. This means that the learning process must be mutual and reciprocal, only then we can fully understand one another. The next step, according to Paulo Freire is not to work for a community but rather with the community to meet their needs and demands. In order to for CAN to continue their progress with the communities in these Latin America, longevity and trust are essential to preserving these relationships and maintaining consistency in their progress. CAN also seeks to produce these relationships with the students and participants of their programs, such as ASB. ASB offers exposure to a distinct way of life with the hope that it sparks an interest to continue exploring what the rest of CAN has to offer here in Santa Cruz and in Latin America. Since CAN is a non-profit organization, its income is based on donations and the income received from Agrocoffee and programs such as ASB. Alternative Spring Break costs $1,500, not including traveler’s insurance and international airfare. This price can be difficult for students to raise, but the reputation that ASB has motivates students to reach the goal. Some students have even decided to return after their first experience in ASB. Long-term impact for ASB is intertwined between CAN and their participants, their international communities, and the students with their host-families. All of these relationships are well valued and essential to continue CAN’s objective.

== Alumni ==
UC Santa Cruz students have been going on ASB 2008. Some students from past years have gone on to study abroad. After ASB is over, a 2 unit class is offered so students can reflect about their experience and find a way to share their experiences. For 2013 ASB participants

== See also ==
- Yucatán
- Tzucacab Municipality
