= Wenceslao Alpuche =

Mexican poet and politician (1804–1841)

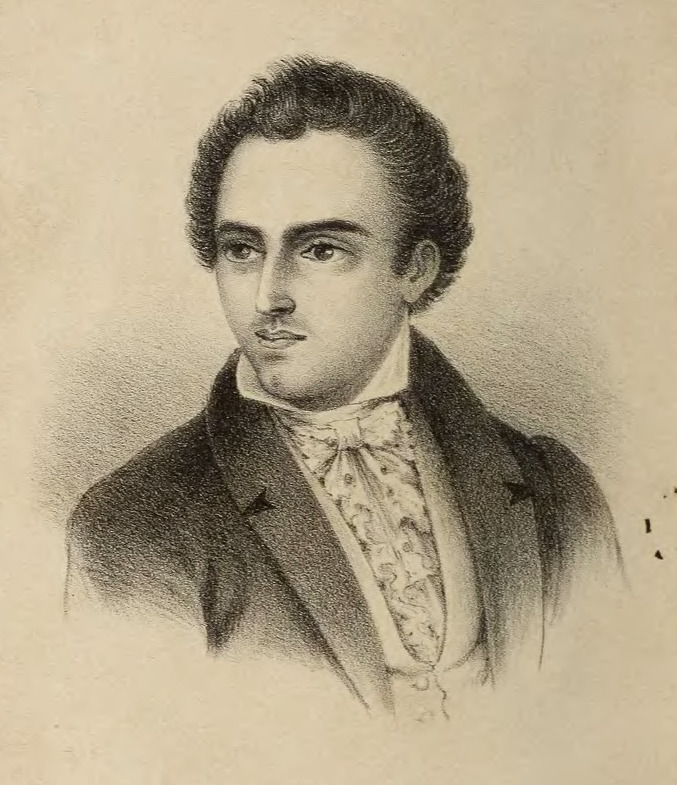
- Born: September 28, 1804; Tihosuco
- Died: September 2, 1841 (aged 36); Tekax Municipality
- Occupation: Poet, writer, playwright

Wenceslao Alpuche y Gorozica (September 28, 1804 – September 2, 1841) was a Mexican poet and politician.

Wenceslao Alpuche was born on September 28, 1804 in Tihosuco, Quintana Roo, Mexico. He studied at a seminary in Mérida but did not become a priest, instead turning to politics and business. He served as a Deputy in the Congress of the Union.

Apluche's work was influenced by Calderón de la Barca, Lope de Vega, Agustín Moreto, and Manuel José Quintana. Apulche published the poetry collection Año Nuevo ("New Year") in 1837.

Wenceslao Alpuche died on September 2, 1841 in Tekax, Yucatán.
