= Kancab =

- Town
- Location within Yucatán (state)
- Coordinates: 20°11′40″N 89°20′44″W
- Country: Mexico
- State: Yucatán
- Municipality: Tekax

Government
  - Mayor: Joshua Manance Couoh Tzec
- Elevation: 90 m (300 ft)

Population (2010)
  - Total: 2,819
- Time zone: UTC-6 (Central Standard Time)
  - Summer (DST): UTC-5 (Central Daylight Time)
- Postal code (of seat): 97970
- Area code: 997
- INEGI code: 310790010

Kancab is a town in the Tekax Municipality, Yucatán in Mexico. As of 2010, the town has a population of 2,819.

== Demographics ==
Historical population

Year	Pop.	±%
1910	435	—
1921	193	−55.6%
1930	300	+55.4%
1940	420	+40.0%
1950	551	+31.2%
1960	756	+37.2%
1970	1,044	+38.1%

Year	Pop.	±%
1980	1,031	−1.2%
1990	1,706	+65.5%
1995	2,113	+23.9%
2000	2,419	+14.5%
2005	2,670	+10.4%
2010	2,819	+5.6%
