= Timeline of the 1990 Atlantic hurricane season =

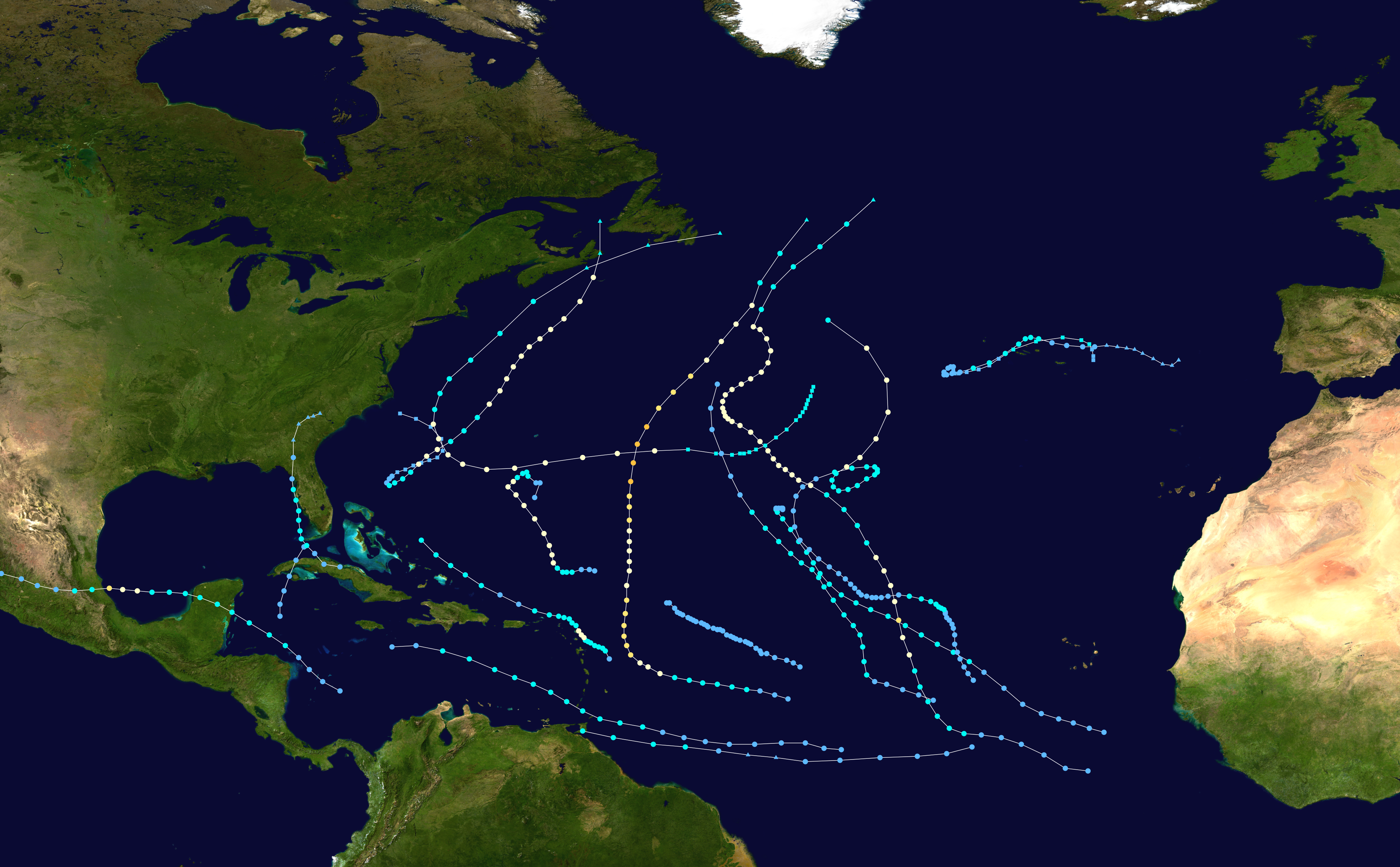
- Season summary map

Season boundaries
- First system formed: May 24, 1990
- Last system dissipated: October 21, 1990

Strongest system
- Name: Gustav
- Maximum winds: 120 mph (195 km/h) (1-minute sustained)
- Lowest pressure: 956 mbar (hPa; 28.23 inHg)

Longest lasting system
- Name: Josephine
- Duration: 15.5 days
Storm articles
- Hurricane Bertha (1990)
- Hurricane Diana
- Hurricane Klaus (1990)
- Tropical Storm Marco (1990)

The 1990 Atlantic hurricane season consisted of the events that occurred in the annual cycle of tropical cyclone formation over the Atlantic Ocean north of the equator. The season officially began on June 1, and officially ended on November 30. These dates, adopted by the convention, historically delimit the period each year when most Atlantic tropical systems form. However, storm formation is possible at any time of the year, as was the case this season, when Tropical Depression One formed on May 24; Hurricane Nana, the season's final system, dissipated on October 21. Overall this year, 16 tropical cyclones formed within the basin, of which 14 became named storms; 8 of those became hurricanes, of which 1, Hurricane Gustav, became a major hurricane. (Note: A major hurricane is a storm that ranks as Category 3 or higher on the Saffir–Simpson Hurricane Scale.)

This timeline documents tropical cyclone formations, strengthening, weakening, landfalls, extratropical transitions, and dissipations during the season. It includes information that was not released throughout the season, meaning that data from post-storm reviews by the National Hurricane Center, such as a storm that was not initially warned upon, has been included.

The time stamp for each event is first stated using Coordinated Universal Time (UTC), the 24-hour clock where 00:00 = midnight UTC. The NHC uses both UTC and the time zone where the center of the tropical cyclone is currently located. The time zones utilized (east to west) prior to 2020 were: Atlantic, Eastern, and Central. In this timeline, the respective area time is included in parentheses. Additionally, figures for maximum sustained winds and position estimates are rounded to the nearest 5 units (miles, or kilometers), following National Hurricane Center practice. Direct wind observations are rounded to the nearest whole number. Atmospheric pressures are listed to the nearest millibar and nearest hundredth of an inch of mercury.

== Timeline ==
=== May ===
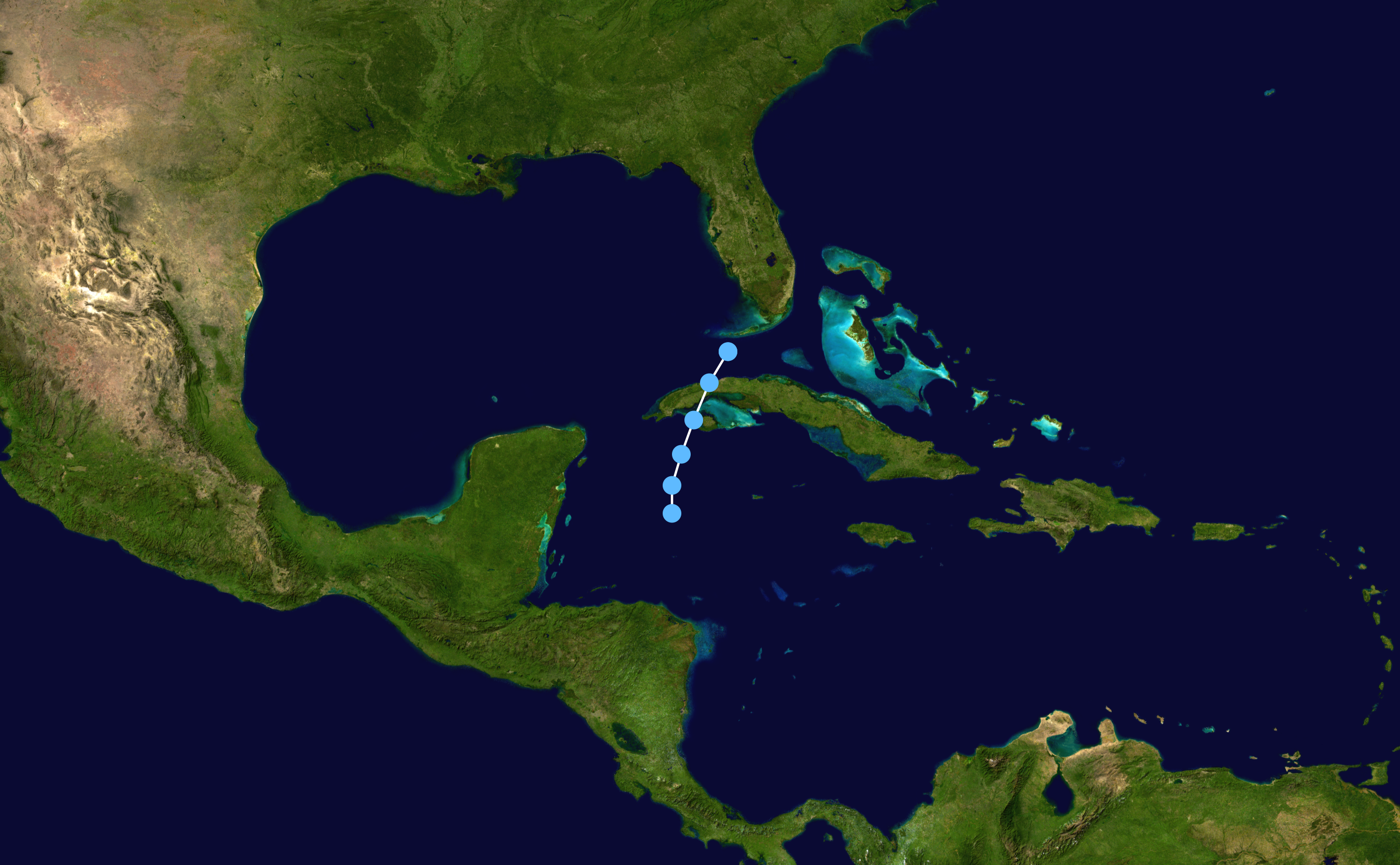
The track of pre-season Tropical Depression One

May 24

- 1800 UTC (2:00 p.m. EDT) – Tropical Depression One develops roughly halfway between Limón, Honduras, and Cape San Antonio, Cuba.

May 25

- 0000 UTC (8:00 p.m. EDT May 24) – Tropical Depression One attains its peak intensity with winds of 30 mph (45 km/h) (Note: The figures for maximum sustained winds and position estimates are rounded to the nearest 5 units (knots, miles, or kilometers), following the convention used in the National Hurricane Center's operational products for each storm. All other units are rounded to the nearest digit.) and a minimum barometric pressure of 1007 mbar (hPa; 29.74 inHg).
- Between 1200 and 1800 UTC (8:00 a.m. and 2:00 p.m. EDT) – Tropical Depression One makes landfall near Guasimal, Matanzas, Cuba with winds of 30 mph (45 km/h).

May 26

- 1200 UTC (8:00 a.m. EDT) – Tropical Depression One is absorbed by an approaching cold front while located about 45 miles (70 km) west of Key West, Florida.

=== June ===
- No tropical cyclones form in the Atlantic basin during the month of June.

June 1

- The 1990 Atlantic hurricane season officially begins.

=== July ===
July 22

- 0600 UTC (2:00 a.m. EDT) – Tropical Depression Two develops about 1,345 miles (2,165 km) east of Port-of-Spain, Trinidad.

July 24

- 1200 UTC (8:00 a.m. EDT) – Tropical Depression Two intensifies into Tropical Storm Arthur.
- 1200 UTC (8:00 a.m. EDT) – A subtropical depression develops just offshore of North Carolina.

July 25

- 1800 UTC (2:00 p.m. EDT) – Tropical Storm Arthur attains its peak intensity with winds of 70 mph (110 km/h) and a minimum barometric pressure of 995 mbar (hPa; 29.38 inHg).

July 27

- 0600 UTC (2:00 a.m. EDT) – Tropical Storm Arthur weakens to a tropical depression.
- 0600 UTC (2:00 a.m. EDT) – The subtropical depression acquires tropical characteristics and is reclassified as Tropical Depression Three.
- 1800 UTC (2:00 p.m. EDT) – Tropical Depression Arthur dissipates south of Jamaica.

July 28

- 0000 UTC (8:00 p.m. EDT July 27) – Tropical Depression Three intensifies into Tropical Storm Bertha.

July 29

- 0000 UTC (8:00 p.m. EDT July 28) – Tropical Storm Bertha intensifies into a Category 1 hurricane.
- 1800 UTC (2:00 p.m. EDT) – Hurricane Bertha weakens to a tropical storm.

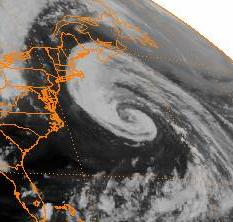
Hurricane Bertha near peak intensity

July 30

- 1200 UTC (8:00 a.m. EDT) – Tropical Storm Bertha re-intensifies into a Category 1 hurricane.

July 31

- 0000 UTC (8:00 p.m. EDT July 30) – Tropical Depression Four develops south of Cape Verde.

=== August ===
August 2

- 0000 UTC (8:00 p.m. EDT August 1) – Hurricane Bertha attains its peak intensity with winds of 80 mph (130 km/h) and a minimum barometric pressure of 973 mbar (hPa; 28.73 inHg).
- 0000 UTC (8:00 p.m. EDT August 1) – Tropical Depression Four intensifies into Tropical Storm Cesar.
- 0600 UTC (2:00 a.m. EDT) – Hurricane Bertha weakens to a tropical storm while making landfall near Sydney, Nova Scotia, with winds of 70 mph (115 km/h). Simultaneously, Tropical Storm Bertha transitions into an extratropical storm.
- 1200 UTC (8:00 a.m. EDT) – Tropical Storm Cesar attains its peak intensity with winds of 50 mph (85 km/h) and a minimum barometric pressure of 1000 mbar (hPa; 29.53 inHg).
- 1800 UTC (2:00 p.m. EDT) – A second subtropical depression develops in the vicinity of the Azores.

August 3

- 1200 UTC (8:00 a.m. EDT) – The second subtropical depression intensifies into a subtropical storm.

August 4

- 0000 UTC (8:00 p.m. EDT August 3) – Tropical Depression Five develops in the southwestern Caribbean Sea.
- 1800 UTC (2:00 p.m. EDT) – The subtropical storm weakens to a subtropical depression.

August 5

- 0000 UTC (8:00 p.m. EDT August 4) – Tropical Depression Five intensifies into Tropical Storm Diana.
- 2000 UTC (3:00 p.m. CDT) – Tropical Storm Diana makes landfall near Felipe Carrillo Puerto, Quintana Roo, on the Yucatan Peninsula with winds of 65 mph (100 km/h).

August 6

- 1200 UTC (8:00 a.m. EDT) – Tropical Storm Cesar weakens to a tropical depression.
- 1800 UTC (2:00 p.m. EDT) – The subtropical depression acquires tropical characteristics and is reclassified as Tropical Depression Six.

August 7

- 0600 UTC (2:00 a.m. EDT) – Tropical Storm Diana intensifies into a Category 1 hurricane after emerging into the Bay of Campeche.
- 1800 UTC (2:00 p.m. EDT) – Tropical Depression Cesar dissipates roughly 1,150 miles (1,850 km) east of Bermuda.
- 1800 UTC (1:00 p.m. CDT) – Hurricane Diana intensifies into a Category 2 hurricane. Simultaneously, the storm attains its peak intensity with winds of 100 mph (165 km/h) and a minimum barometric pressure of 980 mbar (hPa; 28.94 inHg).
- 1900 UTC (2:00 p.m. CDT) – Hurricane Diana makes landfall near Tuxpan, Veracruz, Mexico, with winds of 100 mph (165 km/h).

August 8

- 0000 UTC (7:00 p.m. CDT August 7) – Hurricane Diana rapidly weakens to a tropical storm.
- 1200 UTC (7:00 a.m. CDT) – Tropical Storm Diana weakens to a tropical depression.
- 1800 UTC (2:00 p.m. EDT) – Tropical Depression Six intensifies into Tropical Storm Edouard.

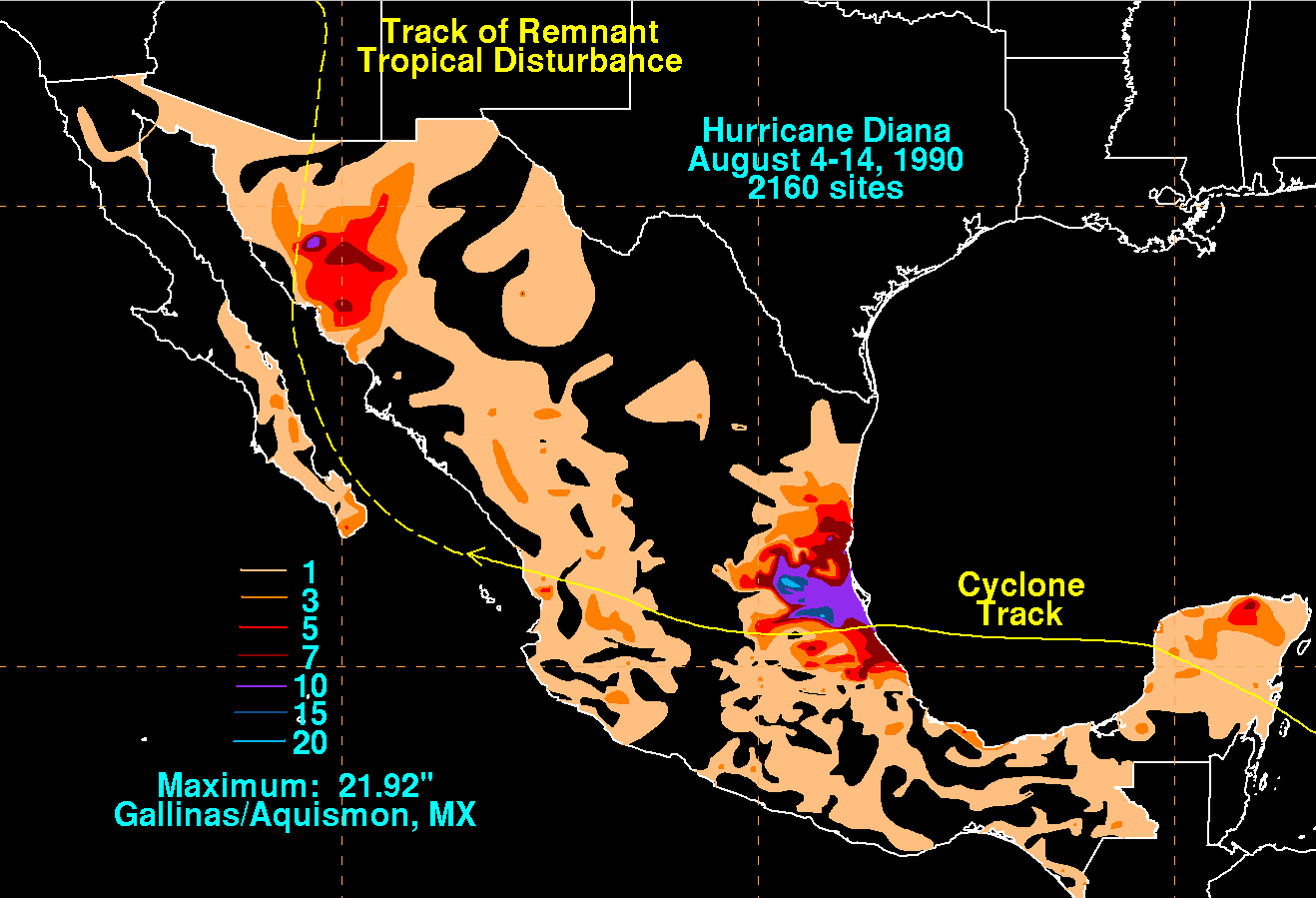
Rainfall totals from Hurricane Diana in Mexico

August 9

- 0600 UTC (2:00 a.m. EDT) – Tropical Storm Edouard attains its peak intensity with winds of 45 mph (75 km/h) and a minimum barometric pressure of 1003 mbar (hPa; 29.62 inHg).
- 1800 UTC (12:00 p.m. MDT) – Tropical Depression Diana dissipates after emerging into the Gulf of California.

August 10

- 1200 UTC (8:00 a.m. EDT) – Tropical Storm Edouard weakens to a tropical depression.

August 11

- 1200 UTC (8:00 a.m. EDT) – Tropical Depression Edouard transitions into an extratropical storm while located east-northeast of the Azores.
- 1200 UTC (8:00 a.m. EDT) – Tropical Depression Seven develops southwest of Cape Verde.

August 13

- 0000 UTC (8:00 p.m. EDT August 12) – Tropical Depression Seven degenerates into a tropical wave.
- 1200 UTC (8:00 a.m. EDT) – The tropical wave re-generates into Tropical Depression Seven.
- 1800 UTC (2:00 p.m. EDT) – Tropical Depression Seven intensifies into Tropical Storm Fran.

August 14

- 1200 UTC (8:00 a.m. EDT) – Tropical Storm Fran attains its peak intensity with winds of 40 mph (65 km/h) and a minimum pressure of 1007 mbar (hPa; 29.74 inHg).
- 1800 UTC (2:00 p.m. EDT) – Due to heavy land interaction with Venezuela, Tropical Storm Fran dissipates in the extreme southeast Caribbean.

August 24

- 0600 UTC (2:00 a.m. EDT) – Tropical Depression Eight develops 965 miles (1,555 km) east of Barbados.

August 25

- 0000 UTC (8:00 p.m. EDT August 24) – Tropical Depression Eight intensifies into Tropical Storm Gustav.
- 0000 UTC (8:00 p.m. EDT August 24) – Tropical Depression Nine develops 700 miles (1,100 km) west-southwest of Cape Verde.

August 26

- 0600 UTC (2:00 a.m. EDT) – Tropical Depression Nine intensifies into Tropical Storm Hortense.
- 1200 UTC (8:00 a.m. EDT) – Tropical Storm Gustav intensifies into a Category 1 hurricane.

August 27

- 0600 UTC (2:00 a.m. EDT) – Hurricane Gustav intensifies into a Category 2 hurricane while passing 205 miles (330 km) to the east of the Lesser Antilles.

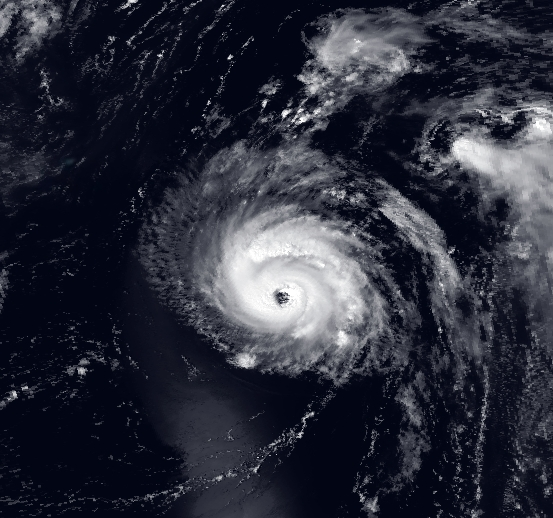
Hurricane Gustav near peak intensity

August 28

- 1200 UTC (8:00 a.m. EDT) – Tropical Storm Hortense attains its peak intensity with winds of 65 mph (100 km/h) and a minimum pressure of 993 mbar (hPa; 29.32 inHg).
- 1800 UTC (2:00 p.m. EDT) – Hurricane Gustav weakens to a Category 1 hurricane.

August 30

- 0600 UTC (2:00 a.m. EDT) – Hurricane Gustav re-intensifies into a Category 2 hurricane.

August 31

- 0000 UTC (8:00 p.m. EDT August 30) – Hurricane Gustav intensifies into a Category 3 hurricane.
- 0000 UTC (8:00 p.m. EDT August 30) – Tropical Storm Hortense weakens to a tropical depression.
- 0600 UTC (2:00 a.m. EDT) – Hurricane Gustav attains its peak intensity with winds of 120 mph (195 km/h) and a minimum barometric pressure of 956 mbar (hPa; 28.23 inHg).
- 1200 UTC (8:00 a.m. EDT) – Tropical Depression Hortense dissipates about 805 miles (1,295 km) east-southeast of Bermuda.

=== September ===
September

- 0000 UTC (8:00 p.m. EDT August 31) – Hurricane Gustav weakens to a Category 2 hurricane.
- 1800 UTC (2:00 p.m. EDT) – Hurricane Gustav weakens to a Category 1 hurricane.

September 2

- 1800 UTC (2:00 p.m. EDT) – Hurricane Gustav weakens to a tropical storm.

September 3

- 0600 UTC (2:00 a.m. EDT) – Tropical Storm Gustav transitions into an extratropical storm while located east of Newfoundland.

September 4

- 0000 UTC (8:00 p.m. EDT September 3) – Tropical Depression Ten develops southwest of Cape Verde.

September 5

- 1200 UTC (8:00 a.m. EDT) – Tropical Depression Ten intensifies into Tropical Storm Isidore.

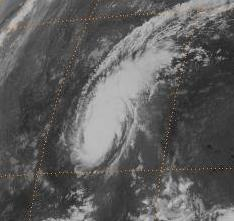
Hurricane Isidore at peak intensity

September 7

- 0000 UTC (8:00 p.m. EDT September 6) – Tropical Storm Isidore intensifies into a Category 1 hurricane.
- 1200 UTC (8:00 a.m. EDT) – Hurricane Isidore intensifies into a Category 2 hurricane. Simultaneously, the storm attains its peak intensity with winds of 100 mph (165 km/h) and a minimum barometric pressure of 978 mbar (hPa; 28.88 inHg).
- 1800 UTC (2:00 p.m. EDT) – Hurricane Isidore weakens to a Category 1 hurricane.

September 8

- 1800 UTC (2:00 p.m. EDT) – Hurricane Isidore weakens to a tropical storm.

September 9

- 1800 UTC (2:00 p.m. EDT) – Tropical Storm Isidore re-intensifies into a Category 1 hurricane.

September 16

- 0600 UTC (2:00 a.m. EDT) – Hurricane Isidore weakens to a tropical storm.

September 17

- 1200 UTC (8:00 a.m. EDT) – Tropical Storm Isidore transitions into an extratropical cyclone while located a few hundred miles east of Cape Race.

September 18

- 0600 UTC (2:00 a.m. EDT) – Tropical Depression Eleven develops about midway between the Lesser Antilles and Africa.

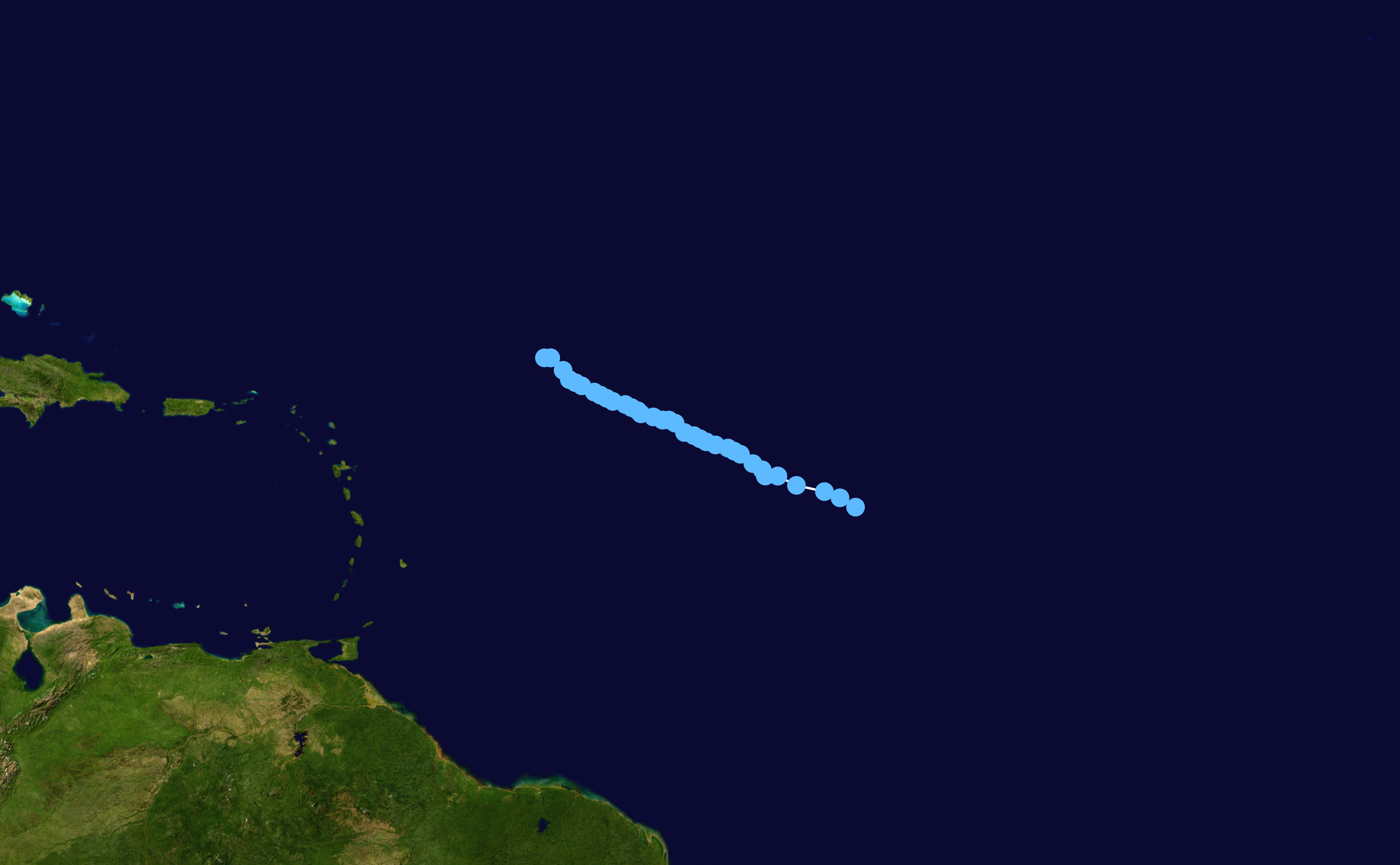
The path of the slow-moving Tropical Depression Eleven; Note: movement was slow enough that one dot represents 24 hours, rather than 6 hours

September 20

- 1800 UTC (2:00 p.m. EDT) – Tropical Depression Eleven attains its peak intensity with winds of 35 mph (55 km/h) and a minimum barometric pressure of 1003 mbar (hPa; 29.62 inHg).

September 21

- 0600 UTC (2:00 a.m. EDT) – Tropical Depression Twelve develops west of Cape Verde.

September 24

- 1200 UTC (8:00 a.m. EDT) – Tropical Depression Twelve intensifies into Tropical Storm Josephine.

September 26

- 0600 UTC (2:00 a.m. EDT) – Tropical Storm Josephine weakens to a tropical depression.

September 27

- 1200 UTC (8:00 a.m. EDT) – Tropical Depression Eleven dissipates well north-northeast of the Lesser Antilles.

=== October ===
October 1

- 1200 UTC (8:00 a.m. EDT) – Tropical Depression Josephine re-intensifies into a tropical storm.

October 3

- 1200 UTC (8:00 a.m. EDT) – Tropical Depression Thirteen develops just east of the Lesser Antilles.
- 1800 UTC (2:00 p.m. EDT) – Tropical Depression Thirteen intensifies into Tropical Storm Klaus.

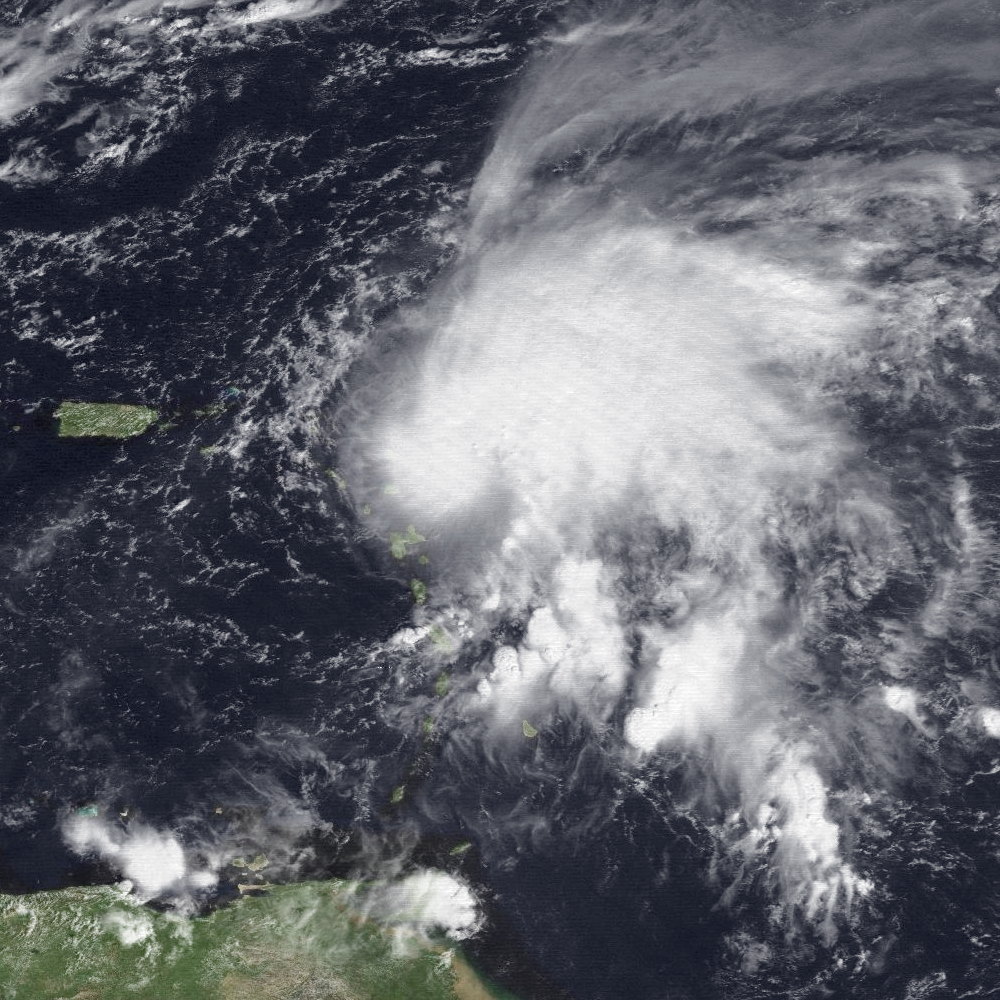
Hurricane Klaus at peak intensity, located roughly 12 miles (20 km) east of Barbuda

October 5

- 0000 UTC (8:00 p.m. EDT October 4) – Tropical Storm Josephine intensifies into a Category 1 hurricane.
- 1200 UTC (8:00 a.m. EDT) – Tropical Storm Klaus intensifies into a Category 1 hurricane, while about 12 miles (20 km) east of Barbuda. Simultaneously, the storm attains its peak intensity with winds of 80 mph (130 km/h) and a minimum pressure of 985 mbar (hPa; 29.09 inHg).
- 1800 UTC (2:00 p.m. EDT) – Hurricane Josephine attains its peak intensity with winds of 85 mph (140 km/h) and a minimum barometric pressure of 980 mbar (hPa; 28.94 inHg).

October 6

- 0600 UTC (2:00 a.m. EDT) – Hurricane Klaus weakens to a tropical storm.
- 0600 UTC (2:00 a.m. EDT) – A subtropical storm develops 875 miles (1410 km) southeast of Cape Race.
- 1200 UTC (8:00 a.m. EDT) – Hurricane Josephine weakens to a tropical storm.
- 1800 UTC (2:00 p.m. EDT) – Tropical Storm Josephine transitions into an extratropical cyclone while west-northwest of the Azores.

October 8

- 0000 UTC (8:00 p.m. EDT October 7) – Tropical Storm Klaus weakens to a tropical depression.
- 1200 UTC (8:00 a.m. EDT) – Tropical Depression Klaus re-intensifies into a tropical storm.

October 9

- 1200 UTC (8:00 a.m. EDT) – Tropical Depression Fourteen develops near Caibarién, Cuba.
- 1800 UTC (2:00 p.m. EDT) – Tropical Storm Klaus is absorbed by a low pressure system.

October 10

- 1800 UTC (2:00 p.m. EDT) – Tropical Depression Fourteen intensifies into Tropical Storm Marco.

October 11

- 0000 UTC (8:00 p.m. EDT October 10) – The subtropical storm acquires tropical characteristics and strengthens into Hurricane Lili. Simultaneously, the storm attains its peak intensity with winds of 75 mph (120 km/h) and a minimum barometric pressure of 987 mbar (hPa; 29.15 inHg).
- 0600 UTC (2:00 a.m. EDT) – Tropical Storm Marco attains its peak intensity with winds of 65 mph (100 km/h) and a minimum barometric pressure of 989 mbar (hPa; 29.21 inHg).

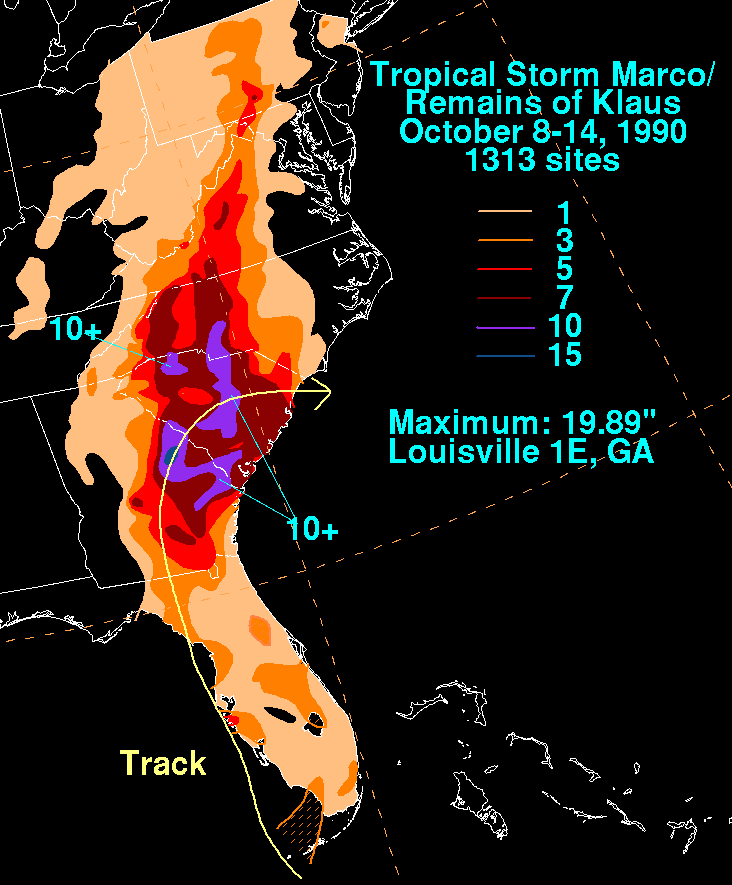
Rainfall from Tropical Storm Marco and the remnants of Hurricane Klaus

October 12

- 0000 UTC (8:00 p.m. EDT October 11) – Tropical Storm Marco weakens to a tropical depression while making landfall near Cedar Key, Florida.
- 1200 UTC (2:00 p.m. EDT) – Tropical Depression Marco transitions into an extratropical cyclone near the Florida–Georgia border.

October 13

- 1200 UTC (8:00 a.m. EDT) – Hurricane Lili weakens to a tropical storm.

October 15

- 0000 UTC (8:00 p.m. EDT October 14) – Tropical Storm Lili transitions into an extratropical cyclone while just offshore of Nova Scotia.

October 16

- 0000 UTC (8:00 p.m. EDT October 15) – Tropical Depression Fifteen develops northeast of the Lesser Antilles.
- 1800 UTC (2:00 p.m. EDT) – Tropical Depression Fifteen intensifies into Tropical Storm Nana.

October 17

- 1800 UTC (2:00 p.m. EDT) – Tropical Storm Nana intensifies into a Category 1 hurricane.

October 19

- 1200 UTC (8:00 a.m. EDT) – Hurricane Nana attains its peak intensity with winds of 85 mph (140 km/h) and a minimum barometric pressure of 989 mbar (hPa; 29.21 inHg).

October 20

- 0000 UTC (8:00 p.m. EDT October 19) – Hurricane Nana weakens to a tropical storm.

October 21

- 0000 UTC (8:00 p.m. EDT October 20) – Tropical Storm Nana weakens to a tropical depression.
- 1800 UTC (2:00 p.m. EDT) – Tropical Depression Nana dissipates south of Bermuda.

=== November ===
- No tropical cyclones form in the Atlantic basin during the month of November.

November 30

- The 1990 Atlantic hurricane season officially ends.

== See also ==
- Timeline of the 1990 Pacific hurricane season
