= X-Hazil Sur =

X-Hazil Sur, Quintana Roo
- Town
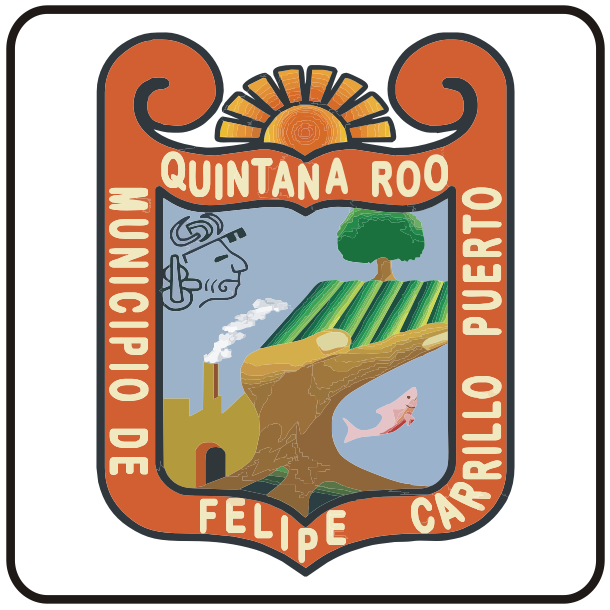
- Emblem

- Location of the Municipality in Mexico
- Coordinates: 19°23′30″N 88°04′27″W
- Country: Mexico
- State: Quintana Roo
- Municipality: Felipe Carrillo Puerto
- Elevation: 10 m (33 ft)

Population (2010)
  - Town: 1,422
  - Urban: 0
- Demonym: Xhazileño
- Time zone: UTC-5 (EST)
- Area code: 77106

X-Hazil Sur is a town in the Mexican state of Quintana Roo, Mexico, localized in state center, in the municipality of Felipe Carrillo Puerto, 1 hour far from the capital of the state. The population was 1,422 inhabitants at the 2010 census.

It is part of the common property land of X-Hazil Sur and aggregates, which is next to the natural reserve of Sian Ka'an and was founded in 1936 by a group of mayan towns coming from the Caste War of Yucatán.

== The common property ==
The common property land or ejido of X-Hazil includes the population nucleus of Chancah Veracruz and Uh-May. Nowadays inhabitants dedicate themselves to agricultural activities and trade of precious woods. Most of the common land owners do the traditional cornfield treatment of "roza-tumba y quema" (hollow/drop down/burn)

The common property land owners and their families have free will of choosing the location of their crops. The only restriction is that it doesn't affect the zones included in the "Plan de cortas" and the reserve.
