= Felipe Carrillo Puerto Municipality =

Felipe Carrillo Puerto
- Municipality
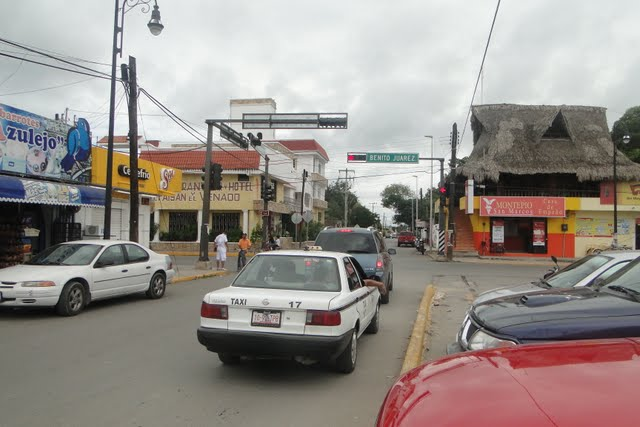

- Coat of arms

- Location within Quintana Roo

- Location within Mexico
- Coordinates: 19°35′N 88°03′W
- Country: Mexico
- State: Quintana Roo
- Named for: Felipe Santiago Carrillo Puerto
- Municipal seat: Felipe Carrillo Puerto

Government
  - Municipal President: C. Gabriel Carballo Tadeo

Area
  - Municipality: 13,806 km^{2} (5,331 sq mi)
- Elevation: 20 m (66 ft)

Population (2009, 2019)
  - Municipality: 83,990
  - Density: 6.084/km^{2} (15.76/sq mi)
  - Urban: 41,230
- Demonym: Carrilloportense
- Time zone: UTC–05:00 (Zona Sureste)
- INEGI Code: 23002
- Website: www.felipecarrillopuerto.gob.mx

Felipe Carrillo Puerto (or simply Carrillo Puerto) is a municipality in the south-central part of the Mexican state of Quintana Roo. The municipal seat is the city of the same name. It was named after the assassinated local politician Felipe Carrillo Puerto. According to the 2009, 2019 census, the municipality's population was 83,990 inhabitants, living on an area of 13,806 square kilometres (5,331 sq mi).

The municipality borders Tulum Municipality to the north, Othón P. Blanco to the south, José María Morelos to the west, as well as Valladolid, Chichimilá, and Tixcacalcupul in the state of Yucatán to the northwest.

== Communities ==
There were 216 populated localities (localidades) enumerated during the 2010 census, in addition to 167 unpopulated localities. The largest localities (cities, towns, and villages) are:

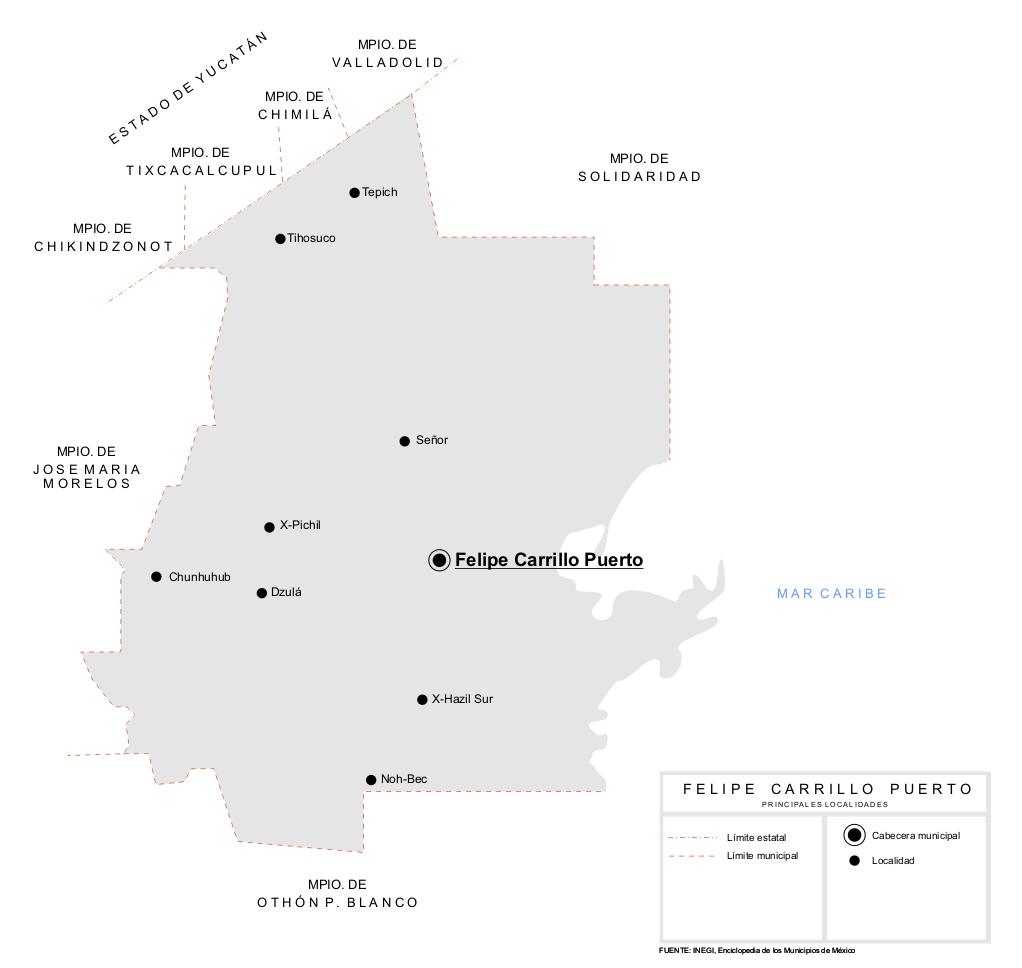
Map of the Municipality of Felipe Carrillo Puerto

Name	Population (2010 census)
Felipe Carrillo Puerto	25,744
Tihosuco	4,994
Chunhuhub	4,644
Señor	3,095
Tepich	2,753
Noh-Bec	2,045
X-Hazil Sur	1,422
X-Pichil	1,470
Polyuc	1,226
Dzulá	1,223
Santa Rosa Segundo	1,068
Presidente Juárez	1,004
X-Yatil	945
Laguna Kaná	914
Yaxley	600
Altamirano	574
Total municipality	75,026

== Demographics ==
Historical population
Year	Pop.	±% p.a.
1995	56,001	—
2000	60,365	+1.51%
2005	65,373	+1.61%
2010	75,026	+2.79%
Source: INEGI Instituto Nacional de Estadística y Geografía

== Archaeological landmarks ==
- Muyil

== Media ==
XENKA-AM, a government-run indigenous community radio station, is based in Felipe Carrillo Puerto.
