= Noh-Bec =

Town in Mexico with over 2000 inhabitants

Noh-Bec Nohbec
- Location within Quintana Roo Location within Mexico
- Coordinates: 19.1428°N 88.1697°W
- Country: Mexico
- State: Quintana Roo
- Municipality: Felipe Carrillo Puerto

Government
  - Federal electoral district: Quintana Roo's 2nd
- Elevation: 8 m (26 ft)

Population (2010)
  - Total: 2,052
- Time zone: UTC-5 (Zona Sureste)
- Climate: Aw

Noh-Bec, also spelled Nohbec, is a town in the municipality of Felipe Carrillo Puerto in the Mexican state of Quintana Roo. According to the 2020 Census, Noh-Bec has a population of 2,052 people.

== History ==
Until 1936, Nohbec was a chicle camp in the central region of the then Territory of Quintana Roo. The camp’s dense jungles provided large quantities of fine wood and sapodilla resin (chicozapote), which was harvested and exported. It was in 1936 that the chicle workers in what is now Noh-Bec, seeking better conditions, organized and petitioned for the creation of their own ejido. The ejido was formally recognized by presidential decree in 1943.

Among the first founders of Nohbec, those who arrived before 1938, were notable figures such as Genaro Yerber, José Blanco González, Encarnación Reyes, Casiano Reyes, Celestino Reyes, Felipe Reyes, Matías Reyes, Demetrio Góngora, Pilar Acosta, Juan Sobrevilla, Emiliano Torres, Juan Cruz Sánchez, and Prisciliano Hernández.

=== The struggle over Timber Resources ===
In its early years, Noh-Bec's primary economic activities revolved around chicle extraction, which was in high demand for chewing gum production. Starting in the 1950s, timber harvesting became an important economic activity in the area, which sparked a long running struggle between ejidos like Nohbec, various politicians, and corporate concession holders over who could profit and to what degree from timber harvesting.

The ejido of Nohbec became one of the most prominent in the region, particularly known for its combative stance against the government of Margarito Ramírez, the local governor who simultaneously acted as a contractor exploiting the area’s wood resources. A key figure in this resistance was Fidel del Ángel, who became a central leader in the fight for fairer wood prices and workers' rights. Under Ramírez’s rule, multiple ejidos, including Laguna Om, Caobas, and Nohbec, united in their struggle to demand better compensation for their wood. For his efforts in defending the cause of local farmers, Fidel del Ángel was persecuted, and ultimately imprisoned for seven months."

By the 1990s, following the implementation of Mexico's Forestry Law of 1986, which ended timber concessions on communal lands and granted timber rights to ejidos, Noh-Bec became one of the first ejidos to manage and harvest timber independently. The community established its own forestry operation, producing valuable timber products such as mahogany and Spanish cedar.

== Population ==
Among the population, only 219 individuals were registered as ejido members, typically descendants of the founding families, primarily male, and with inheritance passed on to a spouse or one child after death. The remaining residents, classified as avecindados, do not have formal voting rights in community matters or legal claims to land, though they are allowed to farm designated areas for subsistence. The avecindados include individuals from the nearby town of Cuauhtémoc, originally from Yucatán, Tabasco, and other southern Mexican states, as well as people from the Indigenous groups of Tzotziles and Tzeltales who sought refuge in Noh-Bec following the eruption of the Chichón volcano in 1982.
