= Alfredo Careaga =

Mexican engineer, physicist, mathematician, conservationist and ecologist

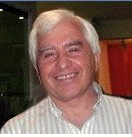
- Photography by Alfredo Careaga
- Born: September 1, 1942; Mexico, Mexico City
- Education: National Autonomous University of Mexico; New York University; Imperial College London; University of London
- Occupations: Professor; Scientist

Alfredo Alejandro Careaga (Mexico City, September 1, 1942) is a Mexican engineer, physicist, mathematician, conservationist and ecologist. He was the founder and general director of the Quintana Roo Research Center, AC (Centro de Investigaciones de Quintana Roo, AC., CIQRO, today El Colegio de la Frontera Sur ECOSUR, Chetumal Unit). He was responsible for coordinating the research and actions that led to the establishment of Sian Ka'an Biosphere Reserve, the first and largest tropical protected area in Mexico. In 2004, he received the Presidential Ecological Merit Award in the individual category, for his contributions to the protection of natural resources and the sustainable management of the environment.

== Biography ==
He obtained a B.Sc. in physics (1967) and another in Mechanical and Electrical Engineering (1966) at the National Autonomous University of Mexico (UNAM). He holds a master's degree in Applied Mathematics from the Courant Institute of Mathematical Sciences, New York University (1969), a master's degree in statistics from the Imperial College of Science & Technology in London (1970), and a PhD in mathematics from the University of London (1973).

He founded and directed the Quintana Roo Research Center, AC (CIQRO) (1978 - 1985), a proactive, interdisciplinary research center devoted to what is now known as sustainable development, and to the establishment of an alternative development model for the state of Quintana Roo. Six Mexican institutions supported the project: the Secretariat of Public Education (Mexico)(SEP), the government of the state of Quintana Roo, the National Autonomous University of Mexico (UNAM), the National Polytechnic Institute (IPN), the National Council of Science and Technology (CONACYT) and the National Water Commission (CNA).

As general director of CIQRO, Careaga was responsible for coordinating the research and actions that led to the creation of the Sian Ka'an Biosphere Reserve , declared a natural heritage of mankind and a biosphere reserve by UNESCO in 1986. He led the research team that founded the "Dr. Alfredo Barrera Marín" Botanical Garden, a 65 hectares conservation facility which covers two of the main local ecosystems: the medium high tropical sub-evergreen forest and the mangrove swamp.

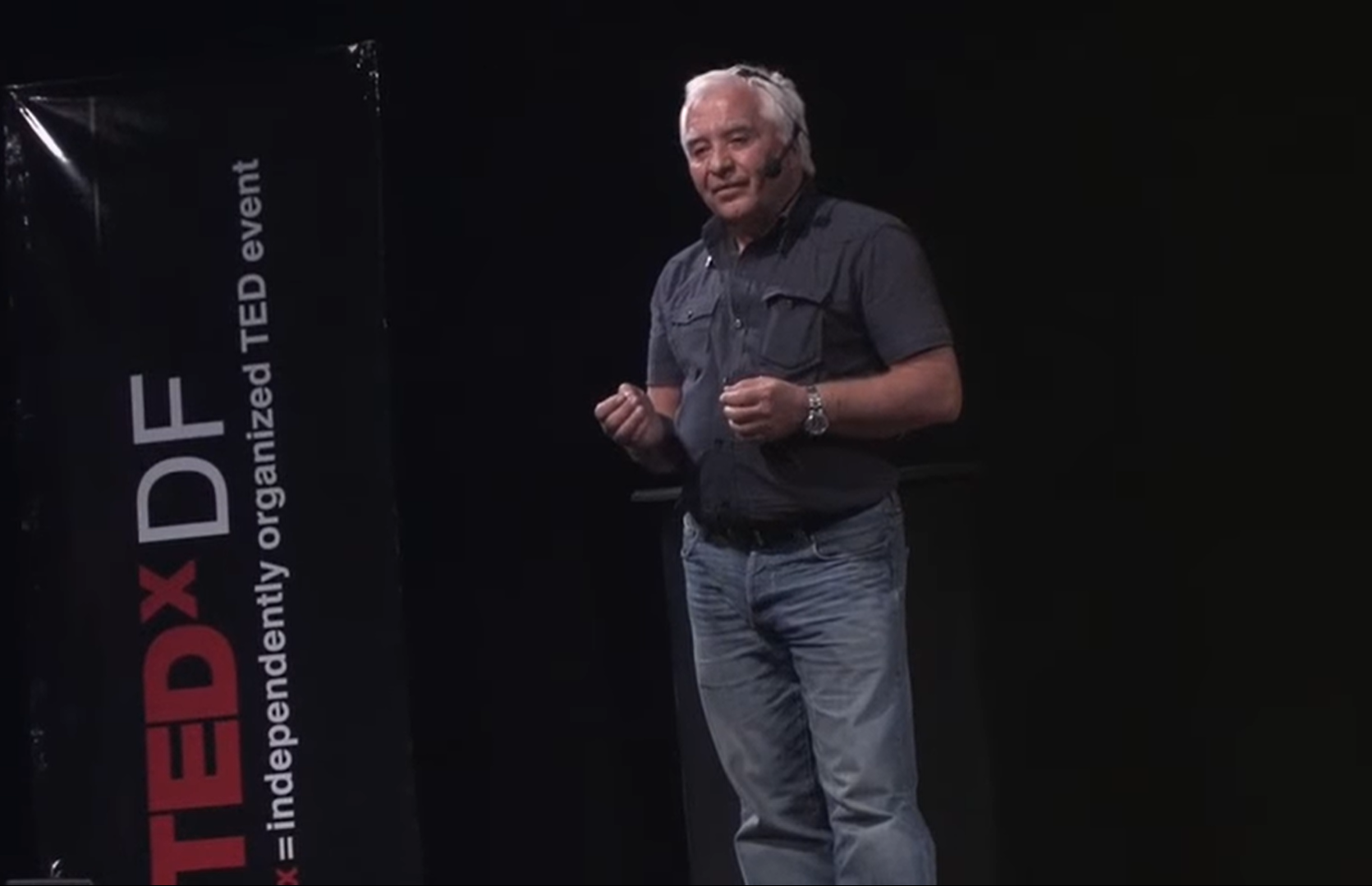
Alfredo Careaga doing a TEDx Talk in Mexico, 2011.

Also, he contributed to the design and dissemination of eco-technological models applied in rural and fishing communities of Quintana Roo, fostering the use of solar and wind energy in homes and production systems.

Commissioned by Jesús Reyes Heroles, head of the Secretariat of Public Education (Mexico) (SEP) in 1986, Careaga participated in implementing policies for the use of computers in the National System of Higher Education in Mexico.

He held the position of Technical Director of the Liaison Office of the National Autonomous University of Mexico (UNAM) (1997 - 1999), as well as deputy director of Technological Innovation for Scientific Dissemination, at the General Directorate of Scientific Dissemination of that same institution (1999 - 2006). From 2006 to 2014 he held a research professorship at Universidad Veracruzana (UV).

== Distinctions ==
On the World Environment Day, June 5, 2004, Careaga received the Presidential Ecological Merit Award, the highest prize awarded by the Mexican Government in this area, for his contributions to the protection of natural resources and the sustainable management of the environment.
