= Chunhuhub =

- Town
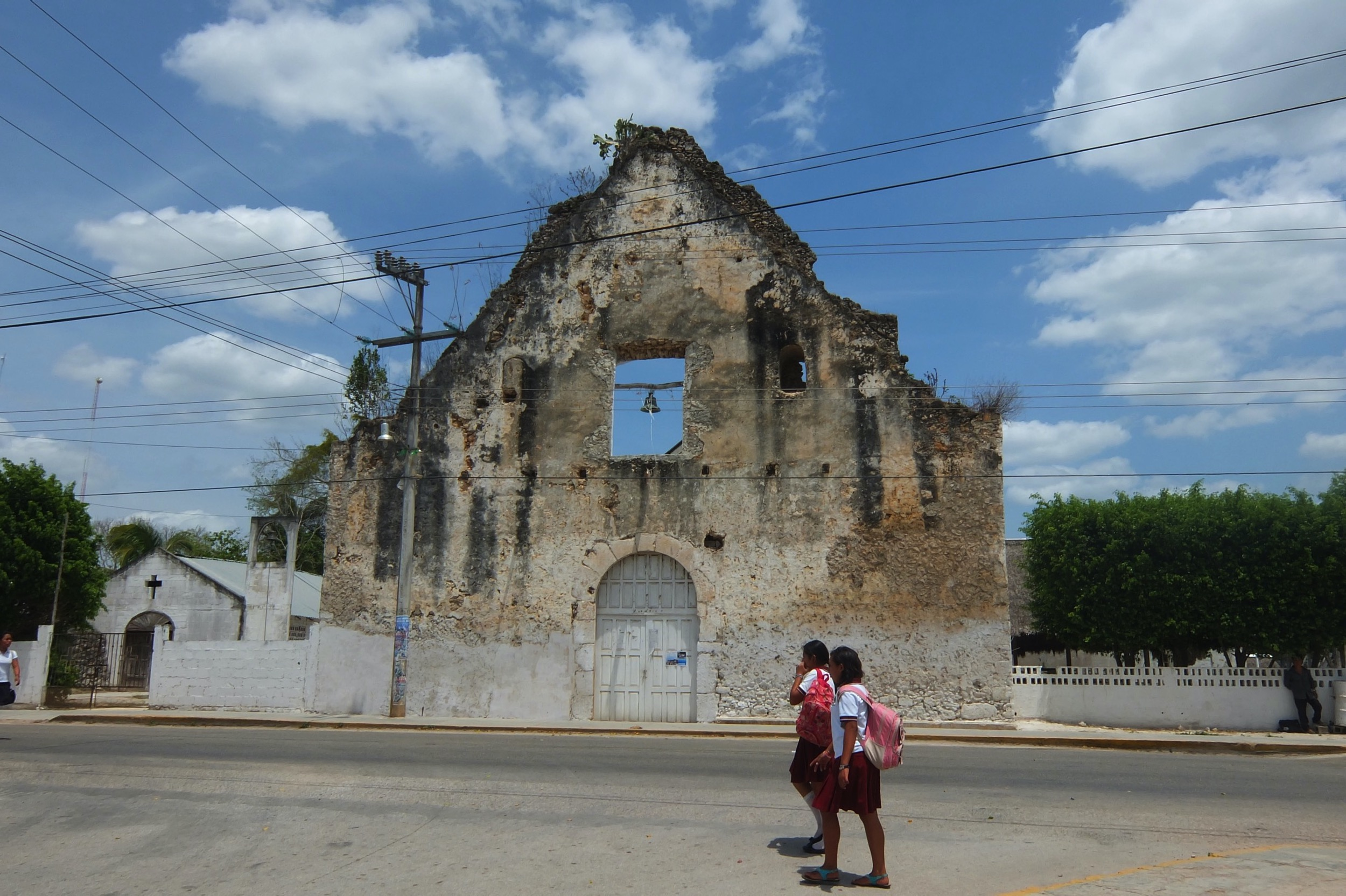
- A historic church in Chunhuhub

- Location of the Municipality in Mexico
- Coordinates: 19°35′07″N 88°35′32″W
- Country: Mexico
- State: Quintana Roo
- Municipality: Felipe Carrillo Puerto
- Elevation: 14 m (46 ft)

Population (2010)
  - Total: 4,644
- Time zone: UTC-5 (EST)

Chunhuhub is a town in the Mexican state of Quintana Roo, Mexico, localized in state center, in the municipality of Felipe Carrillo Puerto. The population was 4,644 inhabitants at the 2010 census.

== History ==
Chunhuhub is located in what was once the pre-Hispanic Maya province of Cochuah. Its name, derived from the Maya word for the trunk of the huhub tree, refers to a local species similar to pine that once grew abundantly in the area. The town served as an important stopover for travelers moving from Mérida toward other settlements in the Maya province of Uaymil, as well as along the routes to Bacalar and Petén.

Like much of the region now known as Quintana Roo, Chunhuhub experienced Colonial rule later than other parts of the Yucatán Peninsula. Cochuah was not fully subjugated until the mid-16th century, after cities such as Mérida, Valladolid, and Campeche were already established. During this period, Chunhuhub was placed under an encomienda, first dependent on the church of Ichmul and later under the parish of Tihosuco. Pedro García, the encomendero granted control of Chunhuhub after the conquest, forced Maya families from surrounding towns like Polyuk to provide labor for the construction of the town’s church. This harsh exploitation, along with diseases introduced by the Spaniards, drove many indigenous residents to seek refuge in the surrounding jungle.

The church itself was likely completed around 1751 and became a focal point of the settlement. It featured a large altar with a half-barrel vaulted ceiling, a choir, a stone baptismal font, a priest’s house, a spacious atrium, and a plaza, while the town’s leading families built their homes around it. Many haciendas also emerged in the area, supporting the growth of Chunhuhub as a colonial settlement.

Throughout its history, the town also bore the name Villa de Salamanca, a settlement that periodically shifted locations across the Yucatán Peninsula, including areas now part of Quintana Roo, Campeche, and Tabasco. Its position made it vulnerable to attacks from Caribbean filibusters. During the Maya uprising of 1847, known as the Caste War, Chunhuhub was captured by indigenous forces, destroyed, and set on fire. Even after this devastation, the town continued to serve as a stopover for both sides during the ongoing conflict.

It was not until 1942 that Chunhuhub was repopulated by mestizo and Yucatecan settlers. Twenty years later, the church was being rebuilt, and with the formal establishment of the Chunhuhub ejido, the town began to develop into a more permanent and stable community.
