= Altamirano, Quintana Roo =

Coordinates: 19°17′15″N 88°34′29″W

Ignacio Manuel Altamirano is a village in Felipe Carrillo Municipality, Quintana Roo, Mexico. It has a 2010 census population of 574 inhabitants, and is situated at 21 meters (69 ft.) above sea level.
