= Xbox, Yucatán =

Town in Yucatán, Mexico

X'box
- Etymology: Yucatan Maya for black
- Location of Xbox X'box (Mexico)
- Coordinates: 20.2039°N 89.0052°W
- Country: Mexico
- State: Yucatán
- Municipality: Chacsinkín

Population (2000)
  - Total: 229

X'box (/ʃboʊʃ/), alternatively called X-box or more simply Xbox, is a town in the Mexican state of Yucatán. It is part of the municipality of Chacsinkín and has a population of 229 as of 2000, with 123 men and 106 women living in 36 homes. The whole population of the village works either in Chacsinkín or in the local farms, which produce avocado, pumpkin, chaya, chicken, and pig products.

== Toponymy ==
Its name originates from a local legend where a woman clad in black appeared by the well in the town. According to residents, in Yucatan Maya, 'X-box' translates to black. The name has attracted attention due to sharing a name with the Xbox console series. Regarding this, the newspaper Vanguardia observed that there are no Xbox consoles in X'box.
