= Hurricane Bertha (1990) =

Category 1 Atlantic hurricane in 1990

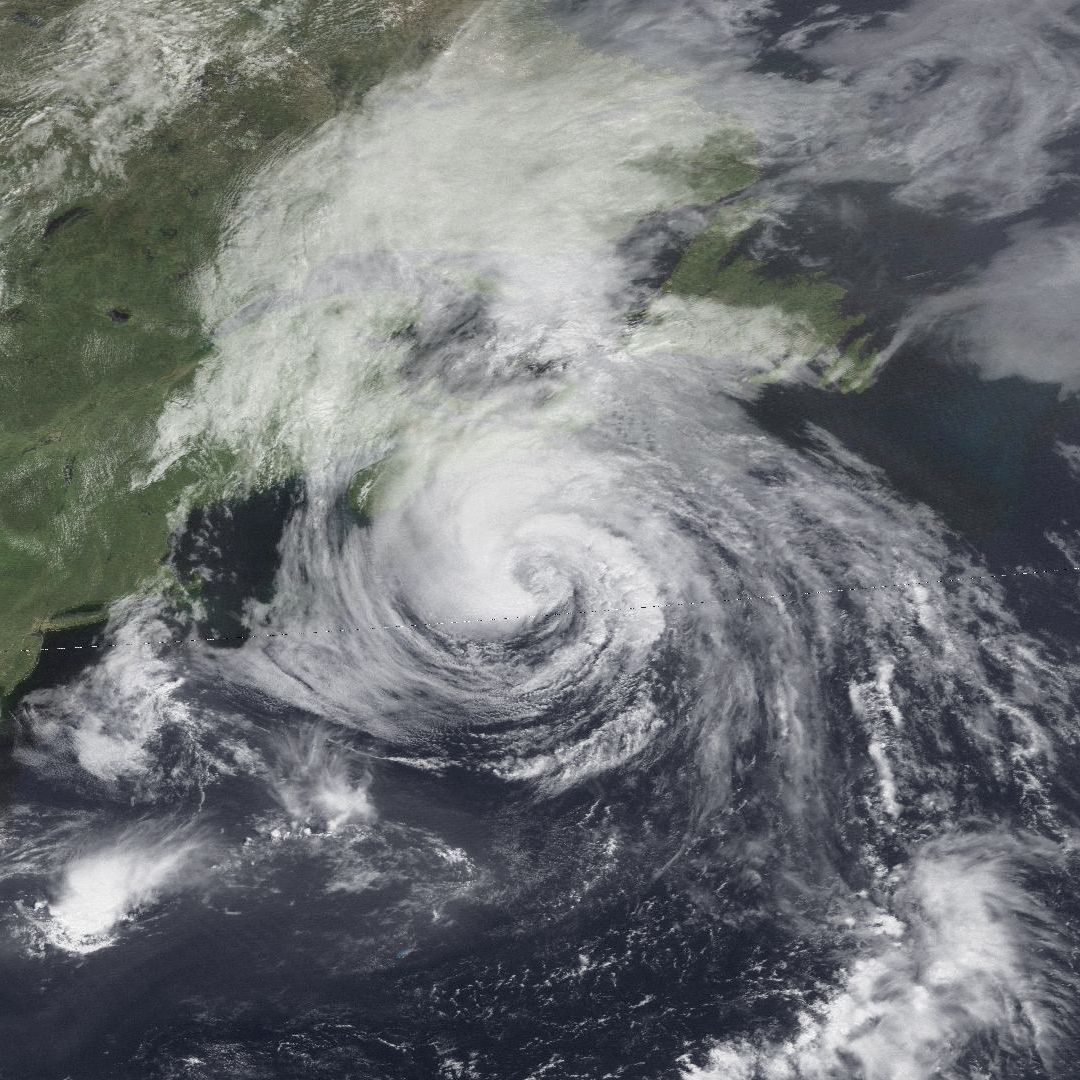
- Bertha at peak intensity south of Nova Scotia on August 1

Meteorological history
- Formed: July 24, 1990
- Dissipated: August 2, 1990

Category 1 hurricane
- 1-minute sustained (SSHWS/NWS)
- Highest winds: 80 mph (130 km/h)
- Lowest pressure: 973 mbar (hPa); 28.73 inHg

Overall effects
- Fatalities: 9 direct
- Damage: $3.91 million (1990 USD)
- Areas affected: Bahamas, East Coast of the United States, Bermuda, Atlantic Canada
- IBTrACS
- Part of the 1990 Atlantic hurricane season

Hurricane Bertha caused minor damage in the United States, Bermuda, and Atlantic Canada in July and August 1990. The third tropical cyclone, second named storm, and first hurricane of the 1990 Atlantic hurricane season, Bertha developed from a frontal low pressure area offshore of North Carolina on July 24. Initially subtropical, it slowly acquired tropical characteristics while tracked southeast and then southwestward. By early on July 27, the cyclone was re-classified as a tropical depression. Following its transition, the depression intensified and was upgraded to Tropical Storm Bertha on July 28. The storm then curved northeastward and rapidly strengthened. Bertha became a hurricane early on July 29, though it weakened back to a tropical storm later that day. On the following day, Bertha re-intensified into a hurricane and peaked as an 80 mph (130 km/h) Category 1 hurricane on July 31.

Early on August 2, Bertha made landfall near Sydney, Nova Scotia while weakening and transitioning back into an extratropical cyclone. Large waves impacted the East Coast of the United States; 25 to 50 feet (7.6 to 15.2 m) waves were reported along the coast of North Carolina. In Florida, rough seas caused two fatalities by drowning, as well as at least 200 lifeguard rescues. Seven other drowning deaths occurred offshore when the SS Corazon sank near Cape Cod. Minimal impact occurred on Bermuda, limited to mainly tropical storm force wind gusts. In Canada, strong winds caused moderate crop damage in Prince Edward Island and collapsed a suspension bridge in Nova Scotia. Rainfall caused minor flooding in the region. Overall, Bertha caused nine fatalities and approximately $3.91 million (1990 USD) in damage.

== Meteorological history ==
Map plotting the storm's track and intensity, according to the Saffir–Simpson scale Map key Saffir–Simpson scale Tropical depression (≤38 mph, ≤62 km/h) Tropical storm (39–73 mph, 63–118 km/h) Category 1 (74–95 mph, 119–153 km/h) Category 2 (96–110 mph, 154–177 km/h) Category 3 (111–129 mph, 178–208 km/h) Category 4 (130–156 mph, 209–251 km/h) Category 5 (≥157 mph, ≥252 km/h) Unknown Storm type Tropical cyclone Subtropical cyclone Extratropical cyclone, remnant low, tropical disturbance, or monsoon depression

A cold front moved eastward through the United States in the middle part of July, and reached the East Coast of the United States on July 23. By the following day, a low pressure area developed just southeast of Cape Hatteras, North Carolina ahead of the frontal zone, and quickly formed into a subtropical depression. In association with a nearby upper-level low, the depression tracked quickly southeastward before turning to the southwest. The subtropical depression gradually organized, and satellite classifications began subsequent to merging with a tropical wave on July 25. Convection developed closer to the center of circulation as it gradually decelerated while continuing southwestward and on July 27, the system organized into Tropical Depression Three while located about 335 miles (539 km) east of Daytona Beach, Florida.

Upon transitioning into a tropical cyclone, the depression executed an elongated counter-clockwise loop to the northeast. Conditions favored further intensification, and based on ship reports, it is estimated the depression strengthened into Tropical Storm Bertha early on July 28. Bertha quickly strengthened to attain hurricane status early on July 29 about halfway between Cape Canaveral, Florida and Bermuda. The strengthening trend was brief, however, as increased vertical wind shear weakened it back to a tropical storm late on July 29, with the center exposed from the deep convection. Bertha continued slowly northeastward to ridging from the Bermuda high extending westward to the United States.

Operationally, forecasters at the National Hurricane Center speculated whether Bertha was transitioning into a subtropical cyclone, due to its deep convection being located, at times, over 200 miles (320 km) from the center. However, the convection progressively returned to the center and by late on July 30, Bertha re-intensified into a hurricane as the convection covered the center, about 415 miles (668 km) east of where it first formed. Early on July 31, the hurricane briefly attained peak winds of 80 mph (130 km/h) before weakening and accelerated northeastward as the ridge of high pressure was slowly eroded. Bertha maintained hurricane status as it approached Atlantic Canada, and briefly reached winds of 80 mph (130 km/h) before weakening and making landfall near Sydney, Nova Scotia on August 1 as a 70 mph (110 km/h) tropical storm. The storm was transitioning into an extratropical cyclone while approaching Atlantic Canada, and lost all tropical characteristics shortly after moving ashore. The weakening extratropical remnants of Bertha turned northward into the Gulf of Saint Lawrence and lost its identity shortly thereafter.

== Preparations and Impact ==
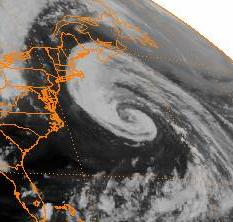
Image of Hurricane Bertha

The formation of Bertha in close proximity of the East Coast of the United States prompted residents to stock up on emergency supplies and monitor the storm. The Maritimes Weather Center and National Hurricane Center began to issue warnings for Nova Scotia and most of Atlantic Canada on July 31 and August 1. By the following day, all warnings and advisories for Atlantic Canada were dropped as Bertha dissipated.

Bertha's broad circulation produced high waves which were reported along the southeastern coast of the United States, in North Carolina, the storm produced waves of 25–50 ft (7.6–15.2 m). The waves caused minor beach erosion along the North Carolina coastline including the Outer Banks. In Florida, rip currents from Bertha caused two drowning fatalities. 200 other swimmers were rescued from the rough seas. The vortex of Bertha forced warm air and blocked sea breezes from South Florida. As a result, record high temperatures were reported in West Palm Beach, Miami, Hollywood, and Miami Beach; temperatures also tied records in Fort Lauderdale. The extreme heat also shattered numerous sliding glass doors and exhausted several air conditioners.

Offshore, several ships came in contact with Bertha, many reported sustained winds of 35–58 mph (56–93 km/h) and a Canadian ship reported a barometric pressure of 985 mbar (29.1 inHg). The only reported shipwreck caused by Bertha was when the Corazon, a Greek freighter capsized and sank during the storm. The ship, which was off the coast of Cape Cod at the time of its sinking, was experiencing strong winds up to 78 mph (126 km/h) and 30 feet (9.1 m) waves. The rough seas caused the ship's keel to break, causing the crewmen to send a distress signal and evacuate the sinking vessel. During the evacuation, one crewman drowned when trying to board a lifeboat, his body was later found by a Soviet merchant ship. Another merchant ship, the Vyapel, spotted twelve of the 27 sailors in their liferaft and the crew of the Vyapel tried to rescue the sailors but to no avail as the rough seas caused the liferaft to drift near the ships propeller and rudder area. The turbulence caused by the ships propeller knocked seven sailors into the water, five of them drowned and a search for their bodies continued until the following day. The remaining 21 sailors were later rescued by crews of other freighters and merchant ships. An investigation by the United States Coast Guard revealed that the Corazon's lifeboats were in too poor of a condition to use in case of an emergency.

Initially, the National Hurricane Center noted the possibility of Bertha impacting Bermuda. However, the storm bypassed Bermuda, which caused only minor effects on the island; limited to rough seas and wind gusts reaching 45 mph (72 km/h).

In Atlantic Canada, Bertha brought strong tropical storm force winds and heavy rainfall. Two weather stations in Baddeck, Nova Scotia and Hunter's Mountain recorded 7 inches (180 mm) of rainfall. In Prince Edward Island, the storm produced a wind gust of 71 mph (114 km/h) and 4.72 inches (120 mm) of rain. A weather station in Port-aux-Basques, Newfoundland and Labrador reported a wind gust of 63 mph (101 km/h) and 2.51 inches (64 mm) of rain. The high winds brought by Bertha caused moderate damage to tobacco and corn crops in Prince Edward Island and damaged a suspension bridge in Nova Scotia. Heavy rainfall from Bertha caused minimal flooding at a golf course. In Peggys Cove, Nova Scotia, six people were injured when waves from Bertha washed them into the sea. Damage was estimated at $4.427 million (1990 CAD, $3.912 million 1990 USD).

== See also ==
- Other storms of the same name
- Timeline of the 1990 Atlantic hurricane season
