= Decauville railway Vigía Chico-Santa Cruz =

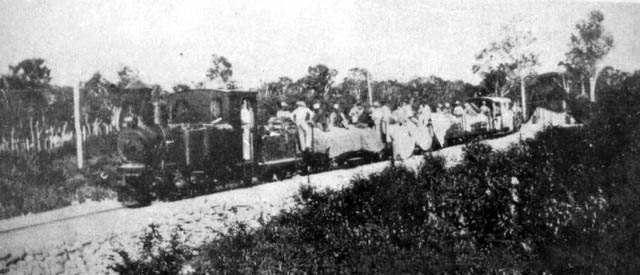

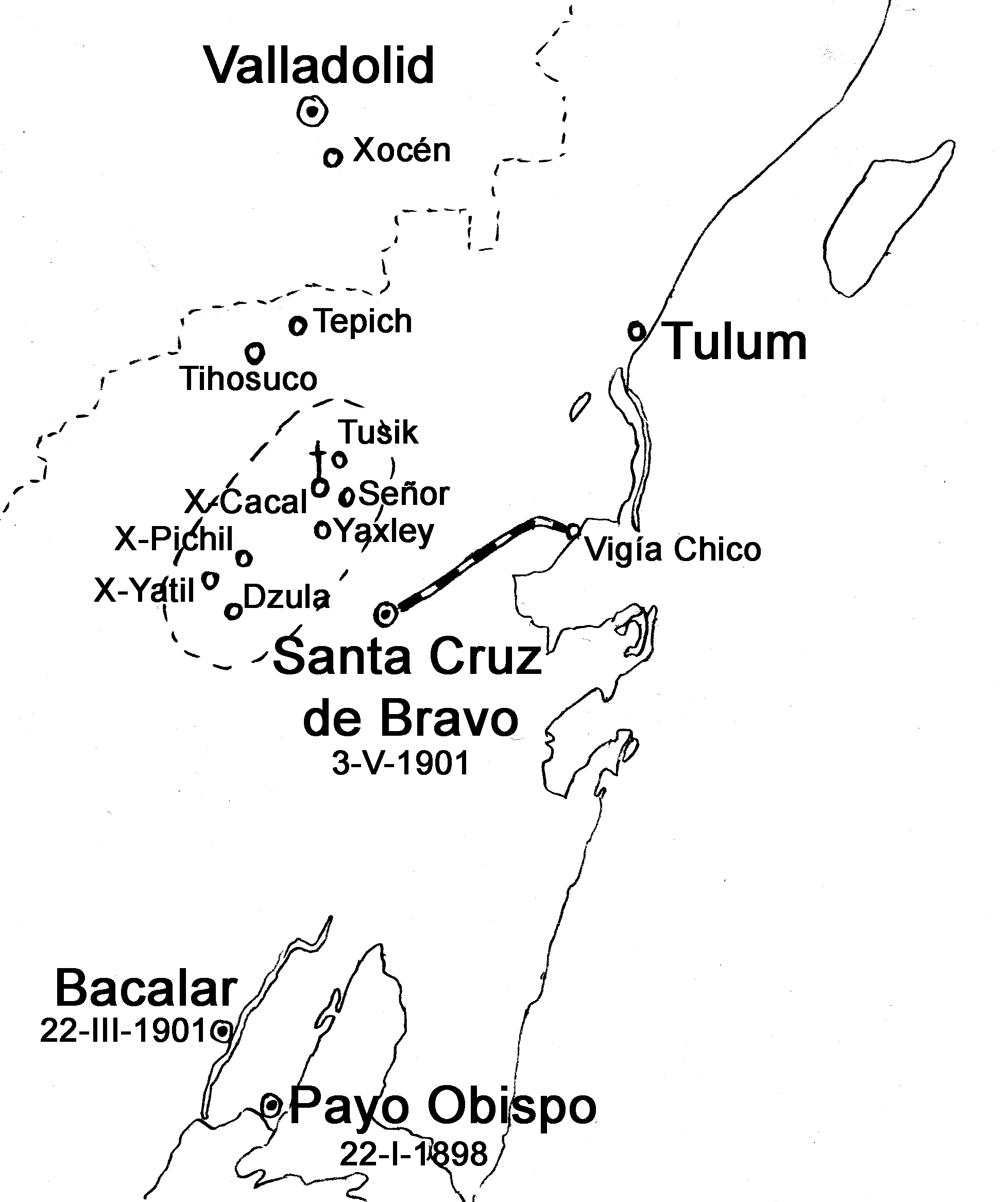
- Map

Technical
- Line length: 56.75 km (35.26 mi)
- Track gauge: 600 mm (1 ft 11 5/8 in)

The Decauville railway Vigía Chico-Santa Cruz (Spanish Ferroaril Decauville de Vigía Chico) was a nearly 57 km (35 mi) long 600 mm (1 ft 11 5/8 in) gauge railway line, which was built during the Caste War of Yucatán at Santa Cruz (now Felipe Carrillo Puerto) in Mexico and operated from 1905 to 1932.

== History ==
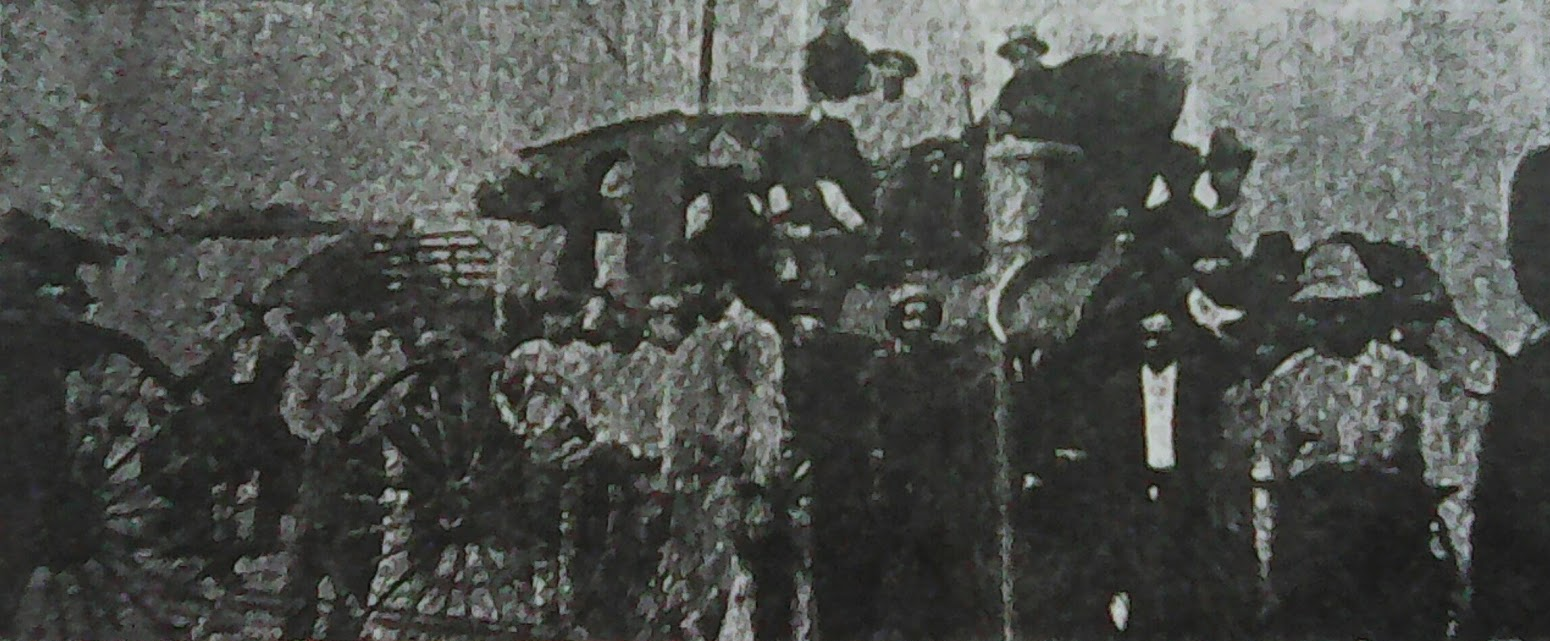
A locomotive, which had been taken out of service as being useless, is awaiting repair by order of General Arturo Gracilazo Juárez c. 1914–15

On 13 December 1901, the material for the railway was ordered in New Orleans. On 16 April 1902, a shipload of 250 tons of narrow-gauge railway material was delivered to the General Vega Camp at the port of Vigía Chico. The track was officially opened on 4 September 1905.

Between 1905 and 1912, the Mayas carried out continuous harassment and attacks on the military railway. When General Ignacio A. Bravo (1837–1918) was expelled from Santa Cruz, the Mayas began to destroy the railway. In 1913, the governor of the territory, General Arturo Gracilazo Juárez, ordered its reconstruction.

In 1918, General Venustiano Carranza granted the Mayan leader Francisco May a license to use the narrow-gauge railway to transport natural rubber. On 1 February 1927, the President of the Republic Plutarco Elías Calles gave the order to rebuild the former military track. On 7 August 1929, General Francisco May again applied for the concession of the former military railway, which was approved by the government under revocation of the concession he had received from Calles. In 1932, when the production of natural rubber reached its low point, the railroad became meaningless.

== Locomotives ==
There were initially three Decauville steam locomotives with 40 hp (30 kW) each, ten wagons each with 6 tons each, 14 flat wagons with 3 tons each. The total cost of the equipment was $ 239,967.59. In addition, there were $ 8,622 for tools, the construction of the platforms and the leveling of the route.

Type	Manufacturer	N°/Year	Today's location
0-4-0T	Hainaut/Couillet, Decauville	166/1895	At the public library, Felipe Carrillo Puerto,19.577946°N 88.042417°W
0-4-0T	Hainaut/Couillet, Decauville	167/1895	
	Arnold Jung, 40 hp, delivered via Arthur Koppel	546/1902	At the lighthouse, Felipe Carrillo Puerto, 19.773398°N 87.58679°W
	Arnold Jung, 40 hp, delivered via Arthur Koppel	547/1902	
	Arnold Jung, 40 hp, delivered via Arthur Koppel	548/1902	

== Sources ==
- Benjamin Arredondo: Más sobre los ferrocarriles en Quintana Roo.
- Benjamin Arredondo: Los ferrocarriles portátiles en Quintana Roo.
- Juana María Rangel Vargas: Un ferrocarril militar en la selva quintanarroense: la vía Decauville de Vigía Chico a Santa Cruz de Bravo, 1901-1939, tesis de maestría, México, Universidad Nacional Autónoma de México, 2005
