= Sian Kaʼan Biosphere Reserve =

Protected area in Quintana Roo, Mexico

- IUCN category Ia (strict nature reserve)
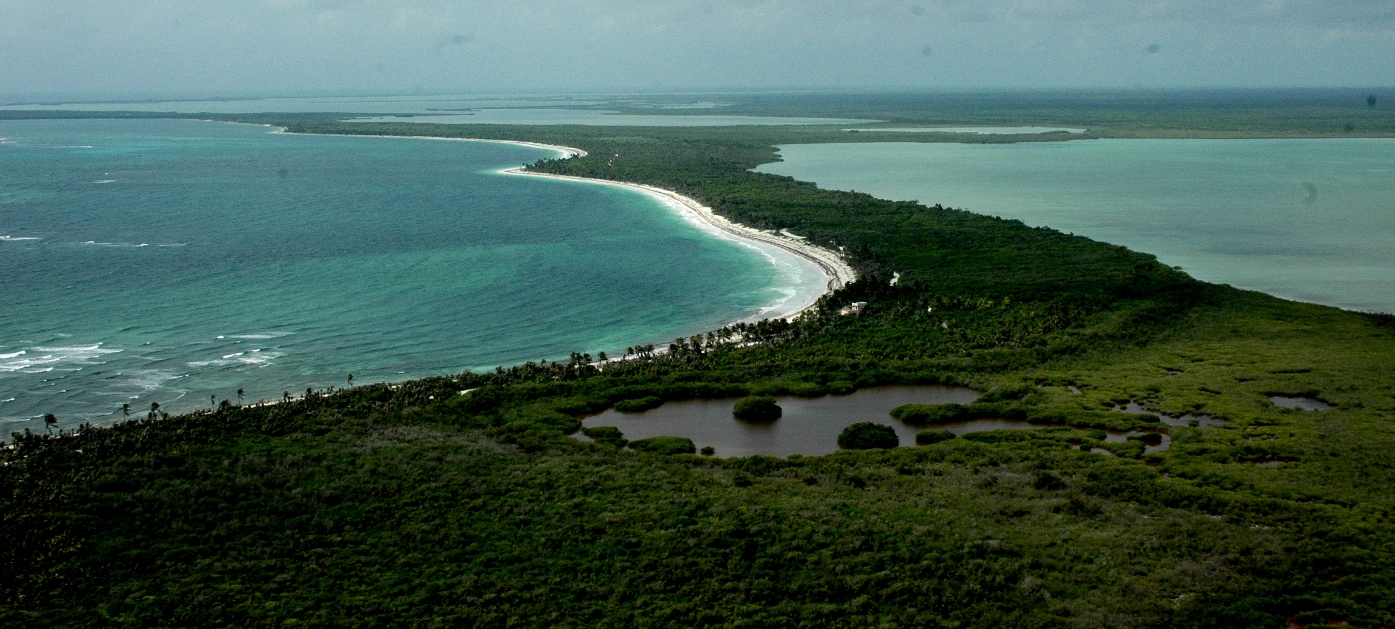
- Sian Kaʼan

- Location within Mexico
- Location: Tulum, Quintana Roo, Mexico
- Coordinates: 19°30′N 87°45′W
- Area: 5,281 km^{2} (2,039 mi^{2})
- Established: 1986
- Administrator: National Commission of Natural Protected Areas

UNESCO World Heritage Site
- Type: Natural
- Criteria: (vii), (x)
- Designated: 1987 (11th session)
- Reference no.: 410
- Region: Latin America and the Caribbean

Ramsar Wetland
- Designated: 27 November 2003
- Reference no.: 1329

Sian Kaʼan Biosphere Reserve (Spanish: Reserva de la Biósfera de Sian Kaʼan) is a biosphere reserve in Tulum Municipality in the Mexican state of Quintana Roo. It was established in 1986 and became a UNESCO World Heritage Site in 1987.

The term Sian Kaʼan, from the Yuatec Mayan language, "means 'gate of heaven' or 'a place where heaven begins.'" By collaborating with scientists, technicians, students, fishermen, farmers, rural promoters and regional and international partners, more than 200 conservation projects have been carried out. Efforts have focused on eight protected natural areas that include the reefs of Banco Chinchorro, and Xcalak at South of Quintana Roo, Sian Kaʼan Biosphere Reserve, Cancún, the island of Cozumel that is located in front of Xcaret and Isla Contoy up north, covering 320,000 hectares (780,000 acres). These areas lie in parts of all seven Caribbean Sea coastal municipalities of the state, with the largest part being in eastern Felipe Carrillo Puerto, where the vast majority of Sian Kaʼan Biosphere Reserve lies.

Part of the reserve is on land and part is in the Caribbean Sea, including a section of coral reef. The reserve has an area of 5,280 square kilometers (2,040 mi^{2}).

The reserve also includes some 23 known archeological sites of the Maya civilization including Muyil. Remains of the Decauville railway Vigía Chico-Santa Cruz, which was operated from 1905 to 1932, can be found at several places.

Within the Amigos de Sian Kaʼan project objectives are the identification, protection, and management of additional areas with high biodiversity value as well as those critical for maintenance of the life cycles of endangered, threatened, and migratory species in the Riviera Maya, providing environmental education through books, journals, and pamphlets, giving technical assistance, and training to Mayan communities working with ecotourism.

== Biological species ==
A list of some of the species recorded in Sian Kaʼan:

- Alouatta pigra (Yucatán black howler monkey)
- Amazona xantholora (yellow-lored amazon)
- Ardea herodias (great blue heron)
- Ateles geoffroyi (Geoffroy's spider monkey)
- Caracara plancus (crested caracara)
- Crax rubra (great curassow)
- Crocodylus acutus (American crocodile)
- Crocodylus moreletii (Morelet's crocodile)
- Ctenosaura similis (black iguana)
- Cuniculus paca (spotted paca)
- Dasyprocta punctata (Central American agouti)
- Dicotyles tajacu (collared peccary)
- Eira barbara (tayra)
- Fregata magnificens (magnificent frigatebird)
- Galictis vittata (greater grison)
- Jabiru mycteria (jabiru)
- Leopardus pardalis (ocelot)
- Leopardus wiedii (margay)
- Meleagris ocellata (ocellated turkey)
- Mycteria americana (wood stork)
- Nasua narica (white-nosed coati)
- Odocoileus virginianus (white-tailed deer)
- Panthera onca (jaguar)
- Pelecanus occidentalis (brown pelican)
- Nannopterum brasilianum (neotropic cormorant)
- Phoenicopterus ruber (American flamingo)
- Platalea ajaja (roseate spoonbill)
- Potos flavus (kinkajou)
- Puma concolor (puma)
- Puma yagouaroundi (jaguarundi)
- Ramphastos sulfuratus (keel-billed toucan)
- Sarcoramphus papa (king vulture)
- Tamandua mexicana (tamandua)
- Tapirus bairdii (Baird's tapir)
- Tayassu pecari (white-lipped peccary)

== See also ==
- Alfredo Careaga
