= José María Alpuche =

Mexican politician (1780–1840)

José María Alpuche e Infante

President of the Chamber of Deputies
- In office 1 January 1830 – 31 December 1830
- Preceded by: José Sotero Castañeda
- Succeeded by: Joaquín Cázares y Armas

Personal details
- Born: 9 October 1780 San Francisco de Campeche, Captaincy General of Yucatán, New Spain
- Died: 10 December 1840 (aged 60) Mexico City, Centralist Republic of Mexico
- Party: Liberal Party
- Other political affiliations: York Rite

José María Alpuche e Infante (9 October 1780 – 10 December 1840) was a Mexican priest, politician, public speaker and writer. During his performance in politics he radically defended federalism and was a member of the York Masonic lodge.

== Biography ==
He completed his ecclesiastical studies at the San Ildefonso Conciliar Seminary in Mérida. He studied philosophy as a partner with Andrés Quintana Roo, Lorenzo de Zavala and Manuel Jiménez Solís. He was a disciple of Pablo Moreno. While acting as a priest in Cunduacán, he was elected deputy to the central Congress to represent the state of Tabasco. Like Miguel Ramos Arizpe and Lorenzo de Zavala, he belonged to the Yorkine lodge, he was its founder in the city of Toluca. He greatly supported the appointment of Vicente Guerrero to the presidency of the country. He collaborated for the newspapers El Correo de la Federación, El Águila, La Gaceta and El Federalista in Mexico City and Yucatán.

When the Congress declared Vicente Guerrero disqualified from exercising the presidency, and Anastasio Bustamante replaced him, he was exiled to New Orleans in the company of Anastasio Zerecero and other federalist legislators, who were considered opponents to the new regime. Alpuche returned to Mexico shortly after Bustamante handed over the presidency to Manuel Gómez Pedraza, after the Zavaleta agreements had been signed.

As a senator, he openly criticized the centralist regime. In 1838, Bustamante ordered the apprehension of Valentín Gómez Farías and José María Alpuche. Alpuche was taken to prison in the Santo Domingo Convent. Far from being intimidated, he continued to publish polemics and agitated the population against the centralist regime. He spent the last years of his life in prison, where he died on 10 December 1840.

== Bibliography ==
- González Pedrero, Enrique (2004). País de un solo hombre: el México de Santa Anna. Volumen II. La sociedad de fuego cruzado 1829–1836 (in Spanish). México: Fondo de Cultura Económica. ISBN 968-16-6377-2.
- Serrano Ortega, José Antonio; Vázquez, Josefina Zoraida (2010). "El nuevo orden, 1821-1848". In Erik Velásquez García (ed.). Nueva historia general de México (in Spanish). México: El Colegio de México. pp. 397–442. ISBN 978-607-462-179-2.
- Sosa, Francisco (2006). "Alpuche e Infante, José María". Biografías de mexicanos distinguidos (in Spanish) (4a. ed.). México: Porrúa. pp. 37–39. ISBN 970-07-6667-5.
