= Celia Mercedes Alpuche Aranda =

Mexican infectious disease specialist

- Born: 25 July 1956 (age 70); Campeche, Mexico
- Education: Universidad Autónoma de Yucatán; National Autonomous University of Mexico
- Occupation: Infectious disease specialist

Celia Mercedes Alpuche Aranda (born 25 July 1956) is a Mexican pediatric infectious disease specialist, researcher and teacher. Since 2013, she has been Deputy Director General of Research Center for Mexico's Infectious Diseases of the National Institute of Public Health.

== Biography ==
Alpuche Aranda was born in Campeche, Mexico. She completed her undergraduate studies at the Universidad Autónoma de Yucatán, where she graduated as a midwife surgeon in 1981. She is a specialist in pediatrics and pediatric infectious diseases from the Universidad Autónoma de Yucatán (1985) and the Hospital Infantil de México Federico Gómez (1987). She also received her master's degree and PhD in medical sciences from the National Autonomous University of Mexico (1990-1993). In 1994, she completed a postdoctoral fellowship at the Infectious Diseases Unit of the Massachusetts General Hospital and cell biology at Harvard Medical School.

From 2007 to 2012, she was president of the Institute for Epidemiological Diagnosis and Reference. From 2012 to 2014, she was president of the Mexican Association of Infectious Diseases and Clinical Microbiology. She is currently a level II researcher of the National System of Researchers, member of the National Academy of Medicine and deputy general director of the Center for Research on Infectious Diseases since 2013. In 2020, she became part of a group of scientists responsible for reflecting on the technical response to the COVID-19 emergency in Mexico.

Alpuche Aranda has directed research on "bacterial pathogenesis, epidemiological and molecular mechanisms of antimicrobial resistance and, more recently, laboratory surveillance of influenza, dengue, among other communicable diseases. She has also been an associate professor at various educational institutions. In addition, she has participated in various technical advisory groups at PAHO and WHO, on different aspects of infectious diseases."

== Selected works ==
She has published 70 scientific articles and 22 books and/or chapters on molecular epidemiology, nosocomial infections and diagnostic methods for viral infections.

- Romano-Mazzotti, L., Alcántar-Curiel, M. D., Silva-Mendez, M., Olivar-López, V., Santos-Preciado, J. I., & Alpuche-Aranda, C. M. (2011). Outbreak of Ralstonia paucula pseudobacteraemia in a paediatric accident and emergency department. Journal of Hospital Infection, 78(2), 155-156.
- Alcántar-Curiel, M. D., Alpuche-Aranda, C. M., Varona-Bobadilla, H. J., Gayosso-Vázquez, C., Jarillo-Quijada, M. D., Frías-Mendivil, M., ... & Santos-Preciado, J. I. (2015). Risk factors for extended-spectrum β-lactamases-producing Escherichia coli urinary tract infections in a tertiary hospital. salud pública de méxico, 57(5), 412-418.
- Cortes-Escamilla, A., López-Gatell, H., Sánchez-Alemán, M. Á., Hegewisch-Taylor, J., Hernández-Ávila, M., & Alpuche-Aranda, C. M. (2018). The hidden burden of Chikungunya in central Mexico: results of a small-scale serosurvey. salud pública de méxico, 60, 63-70.
- Aranda, C. M. A., Arias, C. A., Tejada, C. E., Forde, C., Park, B., Rossi, F., & Thormann, M. (2020). Scientific evidence for the control of antimicrobial resistance. Revista Panamericana de Salud Pública, 44.
- Tamayo-Legorreta, E. M., García-Radilla, A., Moreno-Vázquez, E., Téllez-Figueroa, F., & Alpuche-Aranda, C. M. (2021). Diarrheagenic Escherichia coli pathotypes isolated from a swine farm in a region of Morelos state, Mexico. salud pública de méxico, 63(1, ene-feb), 34-41.

== Awards ==
- National Clinical Research Award "Doctor Miguel Otero" (2019)
