= Tihosuco =

- Town
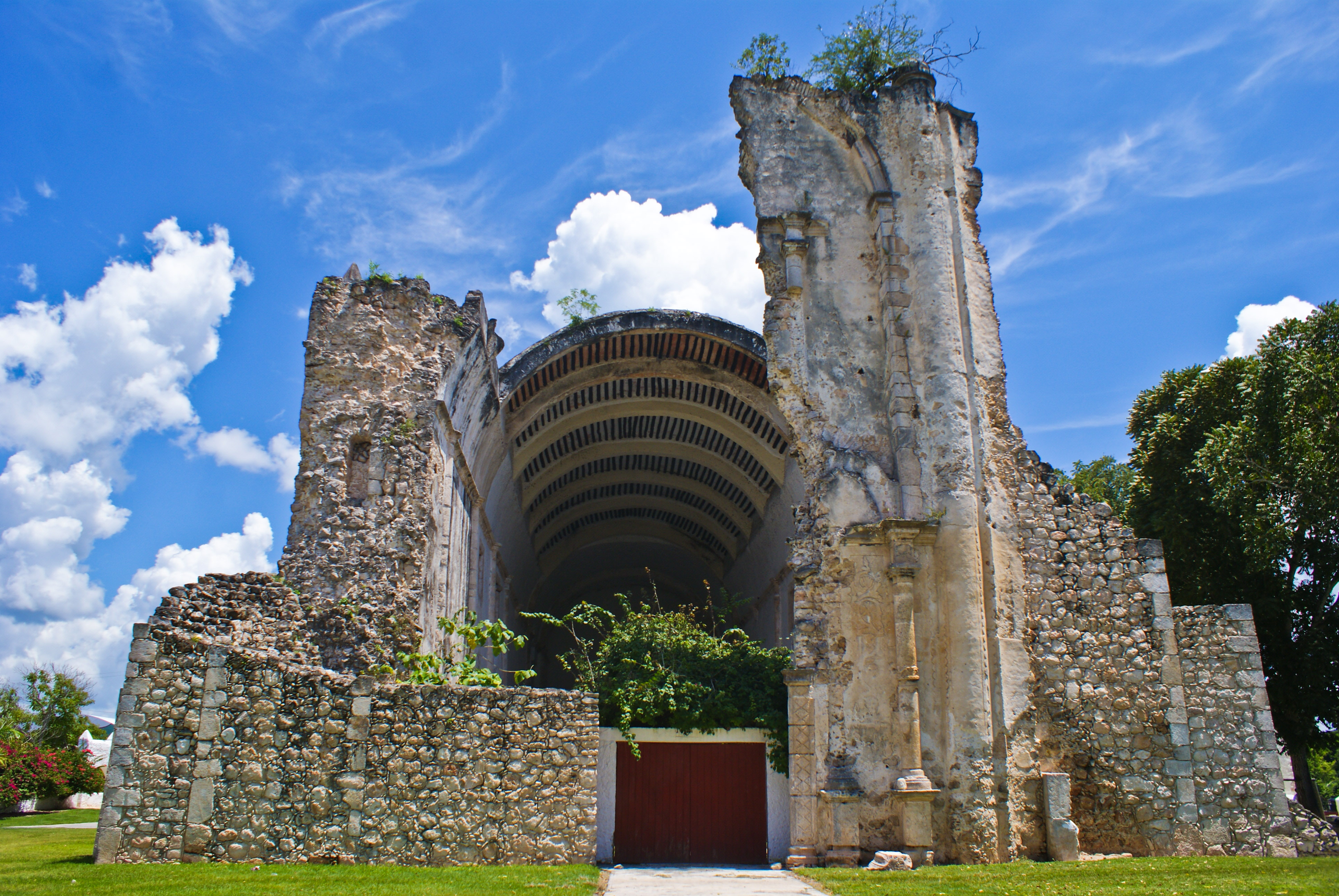
- Templo del Santo Niño Jesús (Temple of the Holy Child Jesus) in Tihosuco

- Location of the Municipality in Mexico
- Coordinates: 20°11′45″N 88°22′25″W
- Country: Mexico
- State: Quintana Roo
- Municipality: Felipe Carrillo Puerto
- Elevation: 30 m (98 ft)

Population (2010)
  - Total: 4,994
- Time zone: UTC-5 (EST)
- Area code: 77121

Tihosuco (Spanish pronunciation: [tixoˈsuko]) is a town in the Mexican state of Quintana Roo, Mexico, localized in state center, in the municipality of Felipe Carrillo Puerto. The population was 4,994 inhabitants at the 2010 census.

== Notable people ==
- Wenceslao Alpuche (1804-1841) - poet
