= Felipe Carrillo Puerto, Quintana Roo =

Felipe Carrillo Puerto
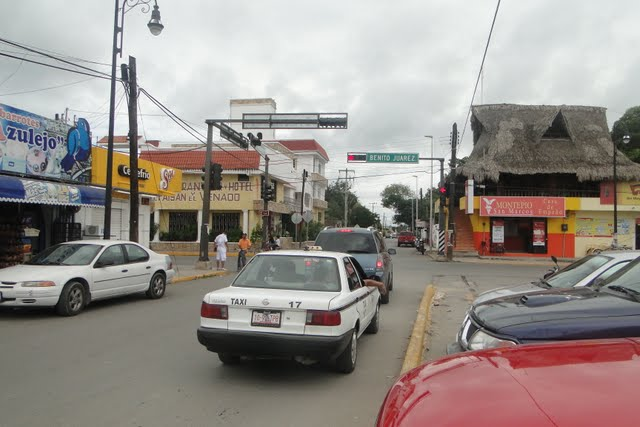

- Location within Mexico
- Coordinates: 19°34′43″N 88°02′43″W
- Country: Mexico
- State: Quintana Roo
- Municipality: Felipe Carrillo Puerto
- Named for: Felipe Santiago Carrillo Puerto

Government
  - Municipal President: Gabriel Carballo
- Elevation: 20 m (66 ft)

Population (2010)
  - Total: 25,744
- Demonym: Carrilloportense
- Time zone: UTC–05:00 (Zona Sureste)
- Climate: Aw
- Website: www.felipecarrillopuerto.gob.mx

Felipe Carrillo Puerto is the municipal seat and largest city in Felipe Carrillo Puerto Municipality in the Mexican state of Quintana Roo. According to the 2010 census, the city's population was 25,744 persons, mostly of Maya descent, and as of 2025, more than 70% of Felipe Carrillo Puerto’s population speaks Mayan.

The Sian Kaʼan Biosphere Reserve lies just east of the city.

== History ==
The city of Felipe Carrillo Puerto was founded in 1850 by independent Maya people during the Caste War of Yucatán under the name Noj Kaaj Santa Cruz Báalam Naj (“Great Town of the Holy Cross, the House of Those on Guard”). The city became the center of resistance against the federal government, and housed the Talking Holy Cross (Santa Cruz Parlante), which was a sacred Maya symbol that embodied their religious beliefs as well as their spiritual and political authority during the war. The city fell to Mexican Federal Army troops in 1901 and was renamed "Santa Cruz del Bravo" before acquiring its present name in honor of politician Felipe Carrillo Puerto in 1932.

The mid 20th century saw the establishment of federal rural schools in the region, as well as ejidos, which were able to negotiate with foreign companies during the chicle boom.

== Geography ==
=== Climate ===
Climate data for Felipe Carrillo Puerto, Quintana Roo (1951–2010)
Month	Jan	Feb	Mar	Apr	May	Jun	Jul	Aug	Sep	Oct	Nov	Dec	Year
Record high °C (°F)	37.0 (98.6)	39.0 (102.2)	42.0 (107.6)	44.0 (111.2)	40.5 (104.9)	40.0 (104.0)	39.0 (102.2)	38.5 (101.3)	40.0 (104.0)	38.0 (100.4)	37.5 (99.5)	39.5 (103.1)	44.0 (111.2)
Mean daily maximum °C (°F)	28.8 (83.8)	29.9 (85.8)	31.7 (89.1)	33.2 (91.8)	34.0 (93.2)	33.1 (91.6)	33.2 (91.8)	33.4 (92.1)	33.0 (91.4)	31.8 (89.2)	30.3 (86.5)	29.0 (84.2)	31.8 (89.2)
Daily mean °C (°F)	22.9 (73.2)	23.6 (74.5)	25.2 (77.4)	26.7 (80.1)	28.0 (82.4)	27.8 (82.0)	27.9 (82.2)	27.8 (82.0)	27.7 (81.9)	26.5 (79.7)	24.8 (76.6)	23.3 (73.9)	26.0 (78.8)
Mean daily minimum °C (°F)	17.0 (62.6)	17.2 (63.0)	18.7 (65.7)	20.3 (68.5)	22.0 (71.6)	22.5 (72.5)	22.5 (72.5)	22.2 (72.0)	22.4 (72.3)	21.2 (70.2)	19.2 (66.6)	17.7 (63.9)	20.2 (68.4)
Record low °C (°F)	4.5 (40.1)	7.0 (44.6)	8.0 (46.4)	6.0 (42.8)	13.5 (56.3)	5.0 (41.0)	15.5 (59.9)	6.0 (42.8)	17.0 (62.6)	11.5 (52.7)	9.0 (48.2)	7.5 (45.5)	4.5 (40.1)
Average precipitation mm (inches)	54.4 (2.14)	50.2 (1.98)	38.5 (1.52)	40.4 (1.59)	117.0 (4.61)	171.8 (6.76)	150.2 (5.91)	160.3 (6.31)	210.4 (8.28)	170.8 (6.72)	84.2 (3.31)	57.0 (2.24)	1,305.2 (51.39)
Average precipitation days (≥ 0.1 mm)	8.4	5.7	4.1	3.6	7.8	13.6	13.9	14.9	17.2	15.4	10.4	8.9	123.9
Average relative humidity (%)	76	75	71	69	71	77	76	78	79	80	78	78	76
Mean monthly sunshine hours	213	245	273	273	258	215	232	232	196	216	215	201	2,769
Source 1: Servicio Meteorológico National (humidity 1981–2000)
Source 2: Deutscher Wetterdienst (sun, 1961–1990) (Note: Station ID for Felipe Carrillo Puerto, Q.ROO. is 76698 Use this station ID to locate the sunshine duration)
