= Tzucacab Municipality =

Municipality in the Mexican state of Yucatán

Tzucacab
- Municipality
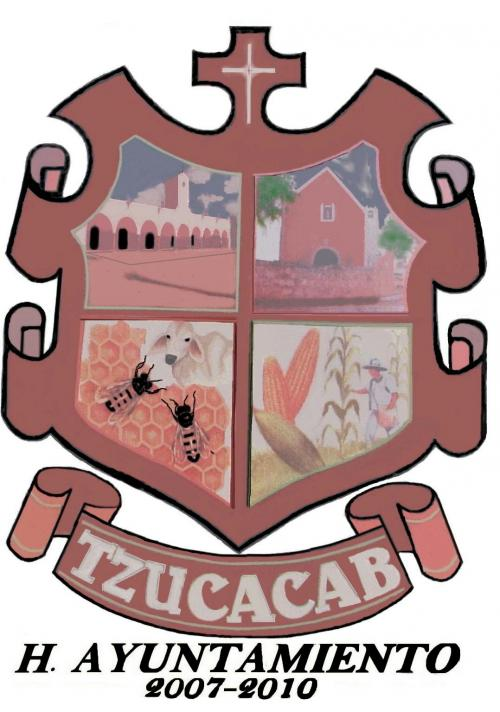
- Coat of arms

- Location of the Municipality

- Location of the Municipality in Mexico
- Coordinates: 20°04′N 89°02′W
- Country: Mexico
- State: Yucatán
- Mexico Ind.: 1821
- Yucatan Est.: 1824
- Municipality Est.: 1918

Government
  - Municipal President: Efren Estrada Mario Camara

Area
  - Total: 1,289 km^{2} (498 sq mi)
- Elevation: 36 m (118 ft)

Population (2005)
  - Total: 13,564
- Time zone: UTC-6 (Central Standard Time)
- INEGI Code: 098
- Major Airport: Merida (Manuel Crescencio Rejón) International Airport
- IATA Code: MID
- ICAO Code: MMMD

Tzucacab Municipality is a municipality in the Mexican state of Yucatán. It has a municipal seat of the same name.

== Geography ==
=== Location ===
Tzucacab Municipality is located in the southern region of the state and falls between latitudes 19° 38' and 20° 09' north and longitudes 88° 59' and 89° 14' west.

=== Climate ===
Climate data for Tzucacab
Month	Jan	Feb	Mar	Apr	May	Jun	Jul	Aug	Sep	Oct	Nov	Dec	Year
Mean daily maximum °C (°F)	29.6 (85.3)	31.7 (89.1)	33.1 (91.6)	35 (95)	35.9 (96.6)	34.5 (94.1)	33.8 (92.8)	34.0 (93.2)	33.3 (91.9)	32.0 (89.6)	30.5 (86.9)	30 (86)	33 (91)
Mean daily minimum °C (°F)	15.2 (59.4)	15.9 (60.6)	17.0 (62.6)	18.2 (64.8)	20.3 (68.5)	20.5 (68.9)	19.7 (67.5)	19.7 (67.5)	19.9 (67.8)	19.2 (66.6)	17.3 (63.1)	16 (61)	18.3 (64.9)
Average precipitation mm (inches)	36 (1.4)	36 (1.4)	28 (1.1)	58 (2.3)	97 (3.8)	180 (7.2)	180 (7)	180 (7.2)	190 (7.6)	140 (5.4)	61 (2.4)	56 (2.2)	1,200 (49)
Source: Weatherbase

== Communities ==
The municipality is made up of 40 different communities, of which the most important are:

- Tzucacab (Municipal Seat)
- Catmis
- Ekbalam
- Corral
- Noh-Bec

== Architectural landmarks ==
The Church of St. Francis Xavier, located in the municipal seat Tzucacab, dates back to the colonial era.
