= Tekax =

City in the Mexican state of Yucatán

- City
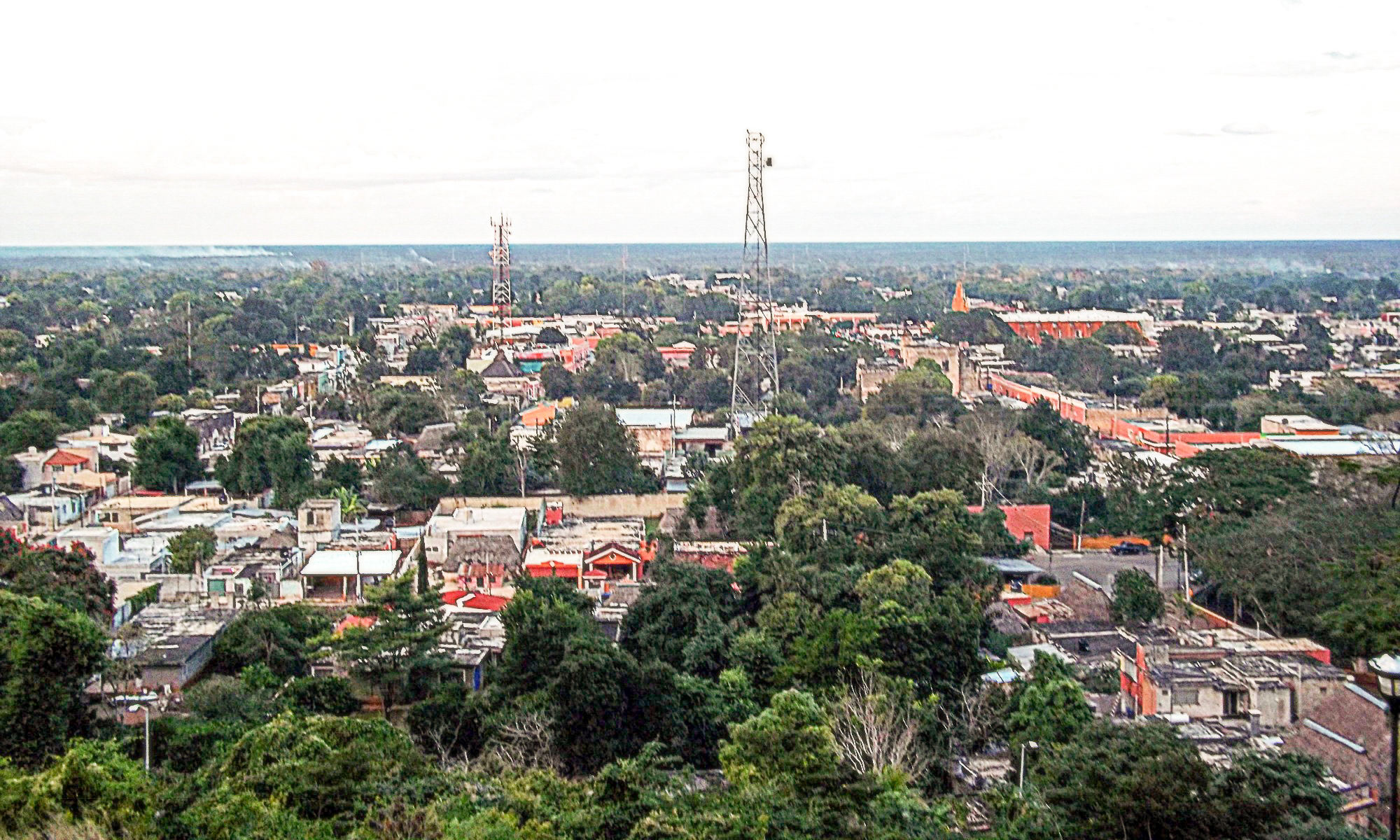

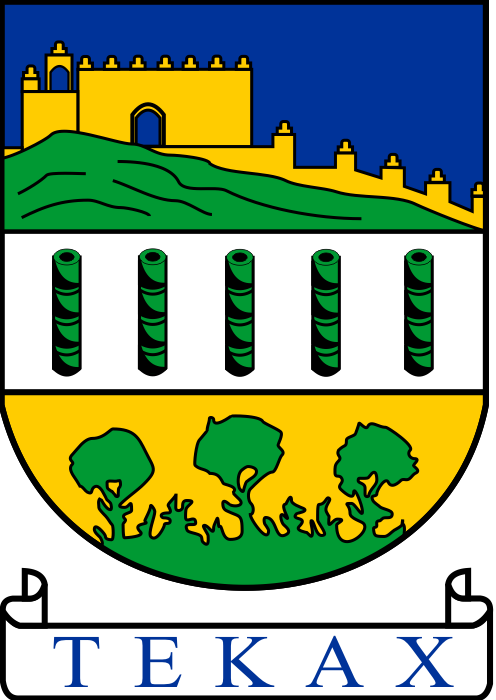
- Flag Coat of arms
- Nickname: La Sultana de la Sierra
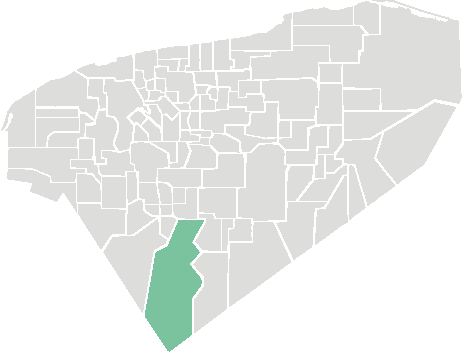
- Location of Tekax in Yucatan

- Location within Yucatán (state) Location within Mexico
- Coordinates: 20°12′07″N 89°17′17″W
- Country: Mexico
- State: Yucatán
- Municipality: Tekax Municipality
- Seat: Tecax

Government
  - Municipal president: Fernando Romero Ávila (PRI)
- Elevation: 20 m (66 ft)

Population (2010)
  - Total: 25 751
- Demonym: Tecaxican
- Postal Code: 97970
- Prefix: 997
- Website: tecax.com.mx

Tekax (from Mayan: Kʼáax), officially Tekax de Álvaro Obregón is a capital city of the municipality of the same name, located in the Mexican state of Yucatán. It has an average height of 37 m above sea level. n. m. and is located at a distance of 115 km from the state capital, the city of Mérida, 10 km from Akil, 18 km from Oxkutzcab and 34 km from Ticul.

In 2023, Tekax was designated a Pueblo Mágico by the Mexican government, recognizing its cultural and historical importance.

== Place names ==
Tekax comes from Mayan: Teʼ place, there, there and kʼáax, jungle, mountain, (from Mayan: Teʼ Kʼáax 'There in the jungle')

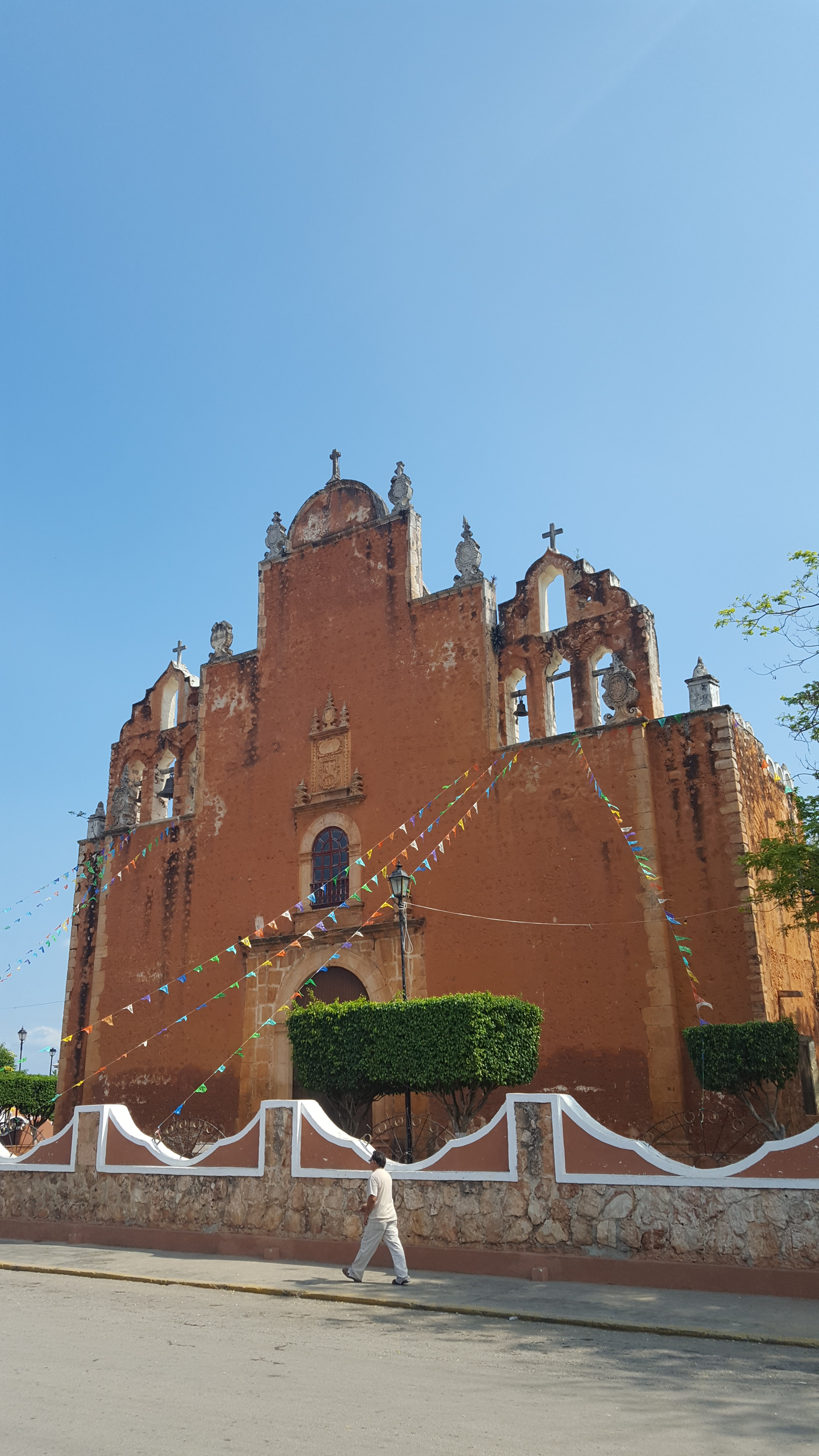
Church on main square, Tekax

== History ==
There are no exact data about the founding of the town, but it is known that in pre-Hispanic times the region belonged to the jurisdiction of the Tutul Xiu, until it was colonized by the Spaniard Alfonso López in the 16th century. The region corresponding to the current municipality of Tekax is considered occupied since pre-Columbian times when the development of the Mayan culture began in the Puuc area; This is attested to by the archaeological sites of Chacmultún, Canahaltún, Chunmul, Xkichmook, Chacchob and Chunconab, which are examples of the Puuc style, although some with influence from the Chenes of Campeche. The Xiues, leaders of the uprising that disintegrated the Mayapán coalition, came down from the southern mountain range and upon founding the town of Maní, they built other tributary towns to it, among which were Kax, built on the slopes of the aforementioned mountain range. The entire group made up the Tutul Xiu chiefdom with its main headquarters in Maní. The Chilam Balam of Chumayel (version by Antonio Mediz Bolio) in its part corresponding to The Book of Lineages mentions: "...and they went to Penkuyut, and they went to Paxuenel, and they arrived at Xaya, and they arrived at a place called Tistis, and they arrived at Chicam, and they arrived at Tixmehuac... when the names of the towns that did not have it were already complete, etc." It does not relate the city of Tekax, however, several of the towns mentioned are fully identifiable from the current municipality of Tekax. In Yucatán, Indian repartitions took place in the years 1547 and 1548. The indigenous town of Kax was valued on February 9, 1549 in favor of Don Francisco Bracamonte and Valdivieso. In 1823 Tekax received the title of Villa and in 1841 it obtained the title of city. However, in 1922 it was demoted to the category of town. In 1928 Tekax was named Ciudad Obregón by decree, but two years later the name was changed to Tekax de Álvaro Obregón.

== Culture ==
Among the colonial or colonial-style buildings, the parish of San Juan Bautista (17th century), the three-story house, the hermitage of San Diego and the chapel of the Eternal Father stand out.

Among the popular festivals are those of San Diego de Alcalá, from November 8 to 13, and that of the Virgin of Guadalupe, from December 4 to 15.

Popular festivals

From April 18 to 22, the Spring Festival is celebrated; from May 8 to June 1, Saint Bartholomew is celebrated and rosaries, masses and processions are held in the town of Pencuyut. In the month of June, the patron saint San Juan Bautista is celebrated. From November 8 to 13, San Diego de Alcalá is celebrated; From December 4 to 15, the Virgin of Guadalupe is celebrated.

== Historical monuments ==
Architectural: Ex-convent and parish of San Juan Bautista 17th century; the hermitage of San Diego, 17th century; the chapel of San Francisco and the chapel of the Eternal Father.

Archaeological: Chamultún, Chuncanap, Itzitz, Nocacab, Santa María, Tzulay, Xaya, Kinil, Tixhualahtun, Chacchob, San Diego, Ticum and Cotbé.

== See also ==
- Symbols of Tekax
