= Tekax Municipality =

Municipality in the Mexican state of Yucatán

Tekax
- Municipality
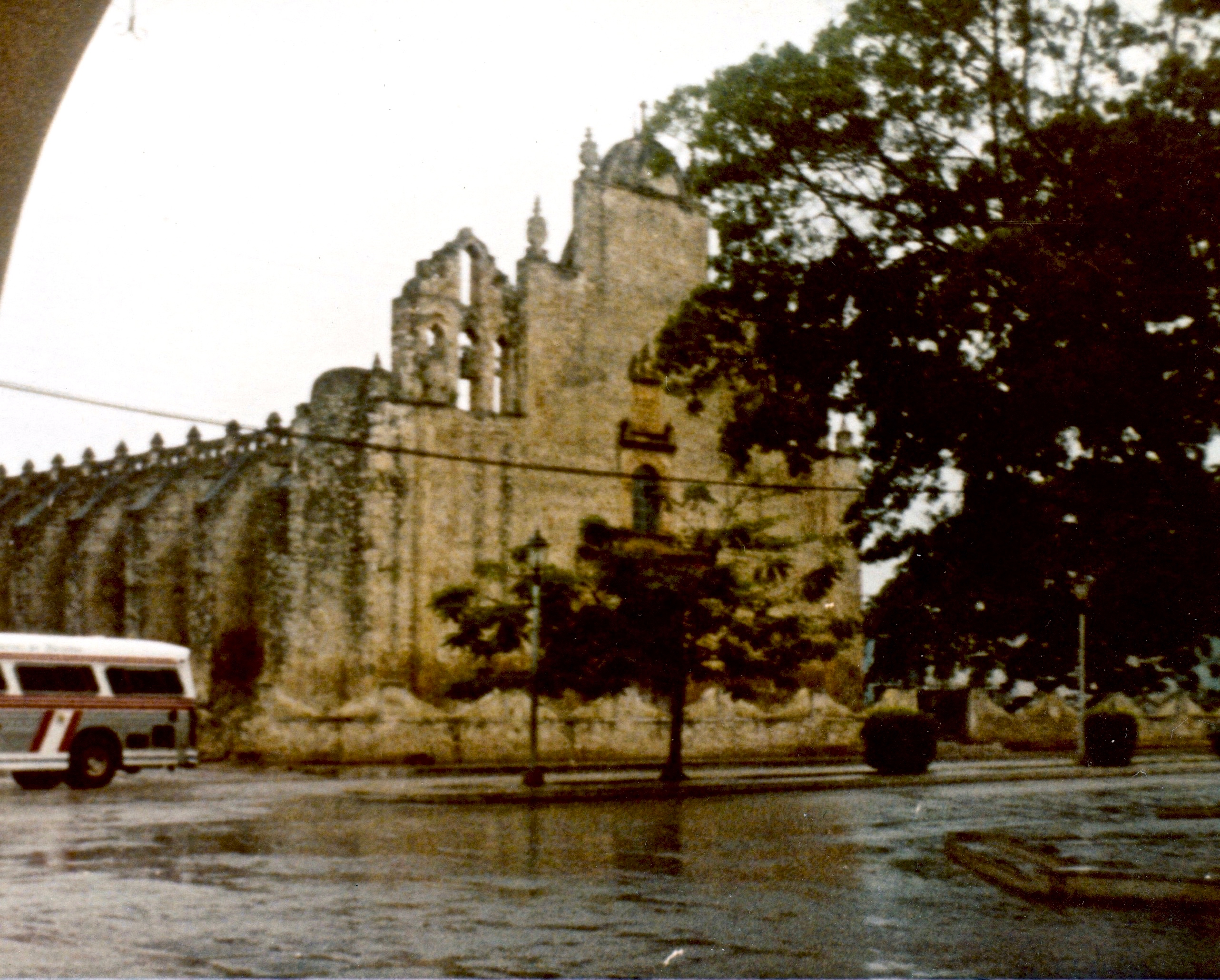
- Principal Church of Tekax, Yucatán

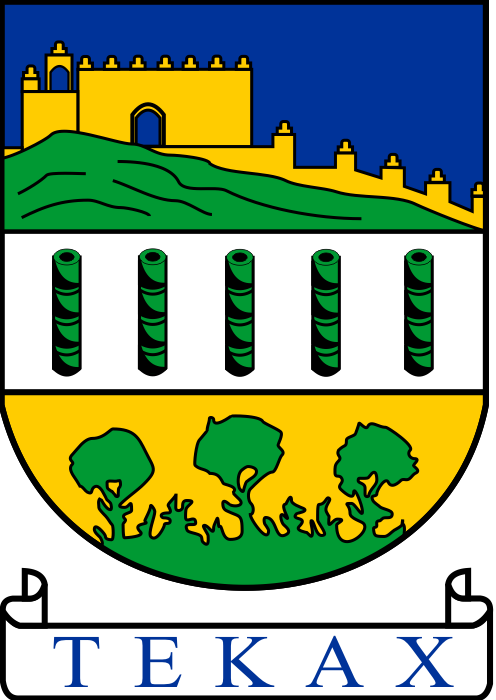
- Coat of arms

- Region 7 Sur #079

- Location of the Municipality in Mexico
- Coordinates: 20°12′07″N 89°17′17″W
- Country: Mexico
- State: Yucatán
- Mexico Ind.: 1821
- Yucatán Est.: 1824

Government
  - Type: 2012–2015
  - Municipal President: Consuelo Del Carmen Navarrete Navarro

Area
  - Total: 3,819.61 km^{2} (1,474.76 sq mi)
- Elevation: 37 m (121 ft)

Population (2010)
  - Total: 40,547
  - Density: 10.615/km^{2} (27.494/sq mi)
  - Demonym: Umanense
- Time zone: UTC-6 (Central Standard Time)
- INEGI Code: 079
- Major Airport: Merida (Manuel Crescencio Rejón) International Airport
- IATA Code: MID
- ICAO Code: MMMD

Tekax Municipality (Yucatec Maya: "rejected tea or forest of Kax trees") is a municipality in the Mexican state of Yucatán containing 3,819.61 km^{2} of land and is located roughly 125 kilometres (78 mi) southeast of the city of Mérida.

== History ==
There is no accurate data on when the town was founded, but it was a settlement before the conquest and under the chieftainship of Tutul Xiu. After colonization, the area became part of the encomienda system with the first encomendero being Francisco de Bracamonte (1549). He was followed by Leonor de Garibay (1607), Andrés Dorantes Magaña and Andrés Dorantes Solís (1611), Bartolomé Días Ugarte (1672), Gabriel Díaz Ugarte and Manuel de Bolio Ojeda y Guzmán (1688) and in 1703, it passed to Pedro Calderón y Robles.

Yucatán declared its independence from the Spanish Crown in 1821, and in 1825 the area was assigned to the High Sierra partition as its own municipality. In 1929, the name of the county seat was changed to Ciudad Obregón, and again changed in 1930 to Tekax de Álvaro Obregón.

== Governance ==
The municipal president is elected for a three-year term. The town council has nine councilpersons, who serve as Secretary and councilors of education; police commissaries; public works; health; public security; cemeteries, parks and gardens; potable water; and public lighting.

The Municipal Council administers the business of the municipality. It is responsible for budgeting and expenditures and producing all required reports for all branches of the municipal administration. Annually it determines educational standards for schools.

The Police Commissioners ensure public order and safety. They are tasked with enforcing regulations, distributing materials and administering rulings of general compliance issued by the council.

== Communities ==
The head of the municipality is Tekax de Álvaro Obregón, Yucatán. The municipality has 98 populated places besides the seat including Alfonso Caso, Becanchén, Benito Juárez, Candelaria Nohalal, Canek, Chacmultún, Flor de Pozo, Huntochác, Jesús, Kancab, Kantemó, Kinil, Kiu Xtoquil, Mac-Yan, Manuel Cepeda Peraza, Nueva Santa Cruz, Nuevo Mundo, Pencuyut, San Alonso, San Antonio Knuc, San Diego I, San Diego II, San Diego Buenavista, San Diego Tekax, San Esteban, San Felipe I, San Felipe II, San Francisco, San Gaspar, San Isidro, San José, San Juan, San Norberto, Santa Cruz, Santa Rosa, Ticum, Tixcuytún, Tzakeljaltun, Xaya, Xkiridz and Xpakan. The significant populations are shown below:

| Community | Population |
|---|---|
| Entire Municipality (2010) | 40,547 |
| Alfonso Caso | 393 in 2005 |
| Becanchén | 1573 in 2005 |
| Canek | 308 in 2005 |
| Huntochac | 321 in 2005 |
| Kancab | 2670 in 2005 |
| Kantemó | 425 in 2005 |
| Kinil | 1068 in 2005 |
| Manuel Cepeda Peraza | 522 in 2005 |
| Pencuyut | 1411 in 2005 |
| Tekax de Álvaro Obregón | 23524 in 2005 |
| Ticum | 927 in 2005 |
| Tixcuytún | 499 in 2005 |
| Xaya | 1676 in 2005 |

== Local festivals ==
Every year from 18 to 22 April the town celebrates a Spring Festival; from 8 May to 1 June in the town of Pencuyut a celebration in honor of St. Bartholomew is held; from 8 to 13 November the town of San Diego de Alcalá holds a fiesta; and from 8 to 15 December 15 in the seat is a celebration in honor of the Virgin of Guadalupe.

== Tourist attractions ==
- Church and ex-convent of San Juan Bautista, built during the seventeenth century
- Hermitage of San Diego, built during the seventeenth century
- archeological sites at Chacchob, Chamultun, Chuncanap, Cotbe, Itzitz, Kinil, Nocacab, San Diego, Santa María, Ticum, Tixhualahtun, Tzulay and Xaya.
- Hacienda Santa María Tekax — on south side of town, visible on youtube and google maps.

== See also ==
- Symbols of Tekax
