= List of North Carolina hurricanes (1980–1999) =

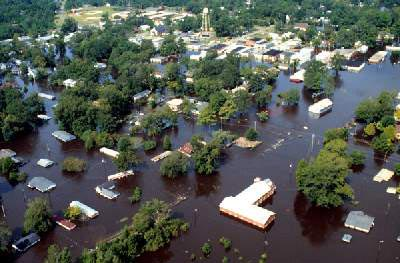
Flooding from Hurricane Floyd in September 1999, one of North Carolina's worst natural disasters

The list of North Carolina hurricanes from 1980 to 1999 encompasses approximately 68 tropical or subtropical cyclones that affected the U.S. state of North Carolina. Collectively, cyclones in North Carolina during the time period resulted in around $10 billion in damage (2007 USD), primarily from hurricanes Fran and Floyd. Additionally, tropical cyclones in North Carolina were responsible for about 56 direct fatalities and at least 47 indirect casualties during the period. Eight cyclones affected the state in the 1985 season, which was the year with the most tropical cyclones impacting the state. Every year included at least one tropical cyclone affecting the state. All but two storms were North Atlantic hurricanes; the exceptions were Eastern Pacific hurricanes Tico in 1983 and Roslyn in 1986.

The strongest hurricane to hit the state during the time period was Hurricane Fran in 1996, which struck near Wilmington as a Category 3 hurricane on the Saffir–Simpson hurricane scale; Hurricane Emily in 1993 brushed the Outer Banks also as a Category 3 hurricane. The deadliest hurricane during the period was Hurricane Floyd in 1999, which caused 35 fatalities and record-breaking flooding in the eastern portion of the state. Cyclones affected the state in each month of the hurricane season from June to November, primarily in September.

== 1980–1984 ==
Hurricane Diana just offshore

- August 27, 1980 – Northeasterly winds from Hurricane Charley contribute to six deaths from strong rip currents.
- June 7, 1981 – The remnants of a tropical depression bring light precipitation to the state.
- July 1, 1981 – Tropical Storm Bret moves ashore on Virginia, with its outer rainbands dropping light rainfall across North Carolina.
- August 20, 1981 – Tropical Storm Dennis brushes the Outer Banks with moderate rainfall peaking at 10.7 inches (271 mm) near Wilmington; scattered power outages and road closures from flooding are reported, but damage is minimal.
- November 12, 1981 – A subtropical storm produces coastal flooding and beach erosion along the East Coast of the United States.
- June 19, 1982 – Subtropical Storm One brushes the coastline and causes some minor flooding due to locally moderate precipitation.
- September 11, 1982 – Tropical Storm Chris makes landfall on Louisiana, and several days later its moisture drops light rainfall in western North Carolina.
- September 30, 1983 – Tropical Storm Dean hits the eastern Virginia coastline and produces scattered rainfall across North Carolina.
- October 24, 1983 – The remnants of Eastern Pacific Hurricane Tico drop moderate precipitation across the state.
- September 13, 1984 – Hurricane Diana strikes near Cape Fear with winds of about 100 mph (160 km/h) after weakening from peak winds of Category 4 status on the Saffir–Simpson hurricane scale. Rainfall in the state peaks at 482 millimetres (19.0 in), and the hurricane causes three indirect fatalities and about $70 million in damage.
- September 29, 1984 – Tropical Storm Isidore parallels the coastline and drops locally heavy rainfall near the coast.
- October 14, 1984 – High surf from Hurricane Josephine causes minor damage and overwash along the Outer Banks.
- October 29, 1984 – A tropical depression dissipates after bringing light rainfall to the western portion of the state.

== 1985–1989 ==
Satellite image of Hurricane Gloria south of the state

- July 25, 1985 – Hurricane Bob hits South Carolina, causing one traffic fatality in North Carolina.
- August 18, 1985 – The remnants of Hurricane Danny drop moderate precipitation while crossing the state.
- September 1, 1985 – Hurricane Elena attains major hurricane status in the Gulf of Mexico, with its outer rainbands dropping light rainfall in the southern portion of the state.
- September 23, 1985 – A tropical depression intensifies into Tropical Storm Henri to the east of the state, dropping light rainfall near the coastline.
- September 27, 1985 – Hurricane Gloria makes landfall on southern Hatteras Island, causing severe coastal flooding and one death in the state.
- October 15, 1985 – Tropical Depression Isabel produces light rainfall along the coastline before dissipating.
- November 1, 1985 – Tropical Storm Juan becomes extratropical over Tennessee and produces heavy rainfall in western North Carolina; the precipitation causes a mudslide that blocked a portion of Interstate 40 near Marion.
- November 22, 1985 – Tropical Storm Kate crosses the extreme southern portion of the state and drops moderate rainfall across the state.
- June 1986 – Surf from Tropical Storm Andrew causes one death in the state.
- August 17, 1986 – Hurricane Charley makes landfall along the state and causes one indirect death; damage is minor and is mostly from tidal flooding and downed trees.
- October 1986 – The remnants of Eastern Pacific Hurricane Roslyn drop moderate precipitation in the western portion of the state.
- August 27, 1987 – The remnants of an unnamed tropical storm produce rainfall along the coastline.
- September 1987 – Tropical Depression Nine produces light to moderate rainfall as it crosses the state.
- August 29, 1988 – Tropical Depression Chris produces light precipitation while crossing the western portion of the state.
- September 5, 1988 – The remnants of Tropical Depression Ten drop rainfall across much of the state.
- September 10, 1988 – Hurricane Florence strikes Louisiana, with its outer rainbands producing light amounts of rainfall in the state.
- November 24, 1988 – The outskirts of Tropical Storm Keith produce light rainfall along the coastline.
- July 1989 – The remnants of Tropical Storm Allison drop heavy rainfall in the state's western region.
- September 22, 1989 – Hurricane Hugo crosses the western portion of the state, with its strong winds destroying or severely damaging many homes across the state. More than 200,000 people are left without power, and the winds flatten about 4200 mi^{2} (11,000 km^{2}) of trees. Damage is estimated at $1 billion (1989 USD, $1.7 billion 2007 USD), and there are 7 deaths in the state, of which one directly.

== 1990–1994 ==
Hurricane Emily off of the Outer Banks

- July 31, 1990 – Hurricane Bertha passes east of the state, causing some rough surf.
- October 11, 1990 – The remnants of Hurricane Klaus drop heavy rainfall in the state's interior section.
- October 13, 1990 – The extratropical remnants of Tropical Storm Marco bring additional heavy rainfall to the state, causing two direct deaths and two indirect traffic deaths.
- October 13, 1990 – Hurricane Lili weakens to tropical storm status to the east of the state, and causes minor beach erosion.
- July 3, 1991 – Light rainfall in the center of the state occurs due to the tropical depression that later becomes Tropical Storm Ana.
- August 19, 1991 – Hurricane Bob brushes the Outer Banks with gusty winds and a light storm surge, causing one death and $4 million in damage (1991 USD, $7 million 2007 USD).
- October 28, 1991 – A subtropical storm becomes Hurricane Grace, and its interaction with a high-pressure system produces heavy surf and gale-force winds along the Outer Banks.
- October 31, 1991 – The 1991 Perfect Storm transitions into a subtropical storm, resulting in additional high surf and causing severe flooding along the Outer Banks; damage amounts to over $5 million (1991 USD, $8 million 2007 USD), which includes the destruction or damage of hundreds of buildings.
- August 28, 1992 – Former Hurricane Andrew dissipates in the western portion of the state, dropping light to moderate precipitation.
- September 25, 1992 – Tropical Storm Danielle brushes the outer banks, causing light flooding which destroys three houses.
- September 29, 1992 – Tropical Storm Earl produces light rainfall near the southeast coastline.
- August 31, 1993 – The western eyewall of Hurricane Emily crosses the northeastern Outer Banks, with its strong winds leaving 553 dwellings uninhabitable. Damage amounts to about $35 million, primarily on Hatteras Island, and the hurricane causes two deaths from rough surf.
- July 5, 1994 – Tropical Depression Alberto moves into Georgia, bringing moisture that causes light rainfall in North Carolina.
- July 21, 1994 – Tropical Depression Two degenerates into a remnant low-pressure area near Charlotte, dropping light rainfall along its path.
- August 17, 1994 – While crossing the western portion of the state, Tropical Depression Beryl spawns nine tornadoes and drops heavy rainfall, peaking at 13.8 inches (351 mm) in Transylvania County which causes some flooding.
- November 17, 1994 – Hurricane Gordon causes significant flooding and strong winds along the Outer Banks, with some beachfront homes in Kitty Hawk being destroyed or severely damaged.

== 1995–1999 ==
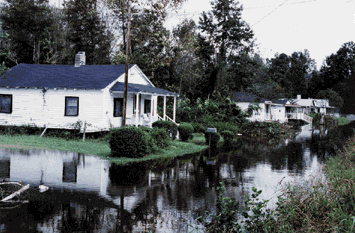
Flooding from Hurricane Fran

- June 6, 1995 – The extratropical remnants of Hurricane Allison produce heavy rainfall in the eastern portion of the state, causing flooding which results in $5 million (1995 USD, $7 million 2007 USD) in crop damage.
- August 7, 1995 – Tropical Depression Erin dissipates over the Appalachian Mountains and drops light rainfall in the state's western portion.
- August 17, 1995 – Hurricane Felix makes its closest point of approach to the state, which causes high surf and rip currents; three people are killed from the surf, and severe beach erosion is reported.
- August 28, 1995 – Tropical Depression Jerry degenerates into a remnant low over Georgia, dropping heavy rainfall that causes localized serious flooding. Dozens of homes sustain flood damage, and monetary damage in the state totals over $7.5 million (1995 USD, $10.2 million 2007 USD).
- September 7, 1995 – Rip currents from Hurricane Luis kill a fisherman in Brunswick County.
- October 5, 1995 – Former Hurricane Opal produces moderate rainfall across and gusty winds across much of the state; a falling tree, as a result of the winds, kills a man when it strikes a mobile home, and also causes one indirect death. Damage amounts to over $15 million.
- June 20, 1996 – Minimal Tropical Storm Arthur crosses the Outer Banks with moderate surf and light rainfall, causing no significant damage.
- July 12, 1996 – Hurricane Bertha makes landfall near Wilmington, destroying hundreds of structures and damaging thousands more, mostly from storm surge. Damage amounts to over $250 million (1996 USD, $325 million 2007 USD), about half of which from crop damage, and there is each one direct and one indirect death in the state.
- August 29, 1996 – Hurricane Edouard begins impacting the state with high surf, which causes some overwash.
- September 6, 1996 – Hurricane Fran makes landfall near Wilmington with winds gusts peaking at 137 mph and a 10-foot storm surge. In North Topsail Beach and Carteret County alone, the hurricane damages or destroys 6,688 structures, while further inland, heavy rainfall causes river flooding. Across the state damage amounts to about $2.55 billion (1996 USD, $3.35 billion 2007 USD), becoming, at the time, the state's worst natural economic disaster. The hurricane causes a total of 14 deaths in the state, of which eight were indirect.
- October 8, 1996 – The extratropical remnants of Tropical Storm Josephine cause some flooding after dropping light to moderate precipitation across the state.
- July 24, 1997 – The remnants of Hurricane Danny re-intensify into a tropical storm over the northeastern portion of the state, producing moderate precipitation up to 12.3 inches (312 mm) in Albemarle. The rainfall causes two deaths from drowning in the western portion of the state.
- August 27, 1998 – Hurricane Bonnie moves ashore near Wilmington as a strong Category 2 hurricane with a moderate storm surge and heavy rainfall from its slow movement across the state. A girl in Currituck County was killed when a large tree fell onto her home. The winds and rainfall cause heavy crop damage, and monetary damage in the state is estimated at $480 million (1998 USD, $610 million 2007 USD).
- September 4, 1998 – The extratropical remnants of Hurricane Earl drop moderate rainfall while crossing the state.
- September 22, 1998 – The remnants of Tropical Storm Hermine produces light rainfall in the state.
- September 29, 1998 – Former Hurricane Georges weakens to tropical depression status, later dropping light rainfall in the state.

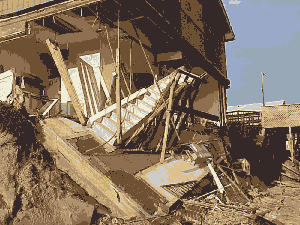
Coastal property damage from Hurricane Floyd

- August 30, 1999 – Hurricane Dennis parallels the state offshore, and five days later it executes a loop and makes landfall along Cape Lookout National Seashore as a strong tropical storm. The hurricane drops heavy rainfall peaking at 19.9 inches (506 mm) in Ocracoke, while its extended duration offshore causes localized severe beach erosion. The rainfall causes flooding along several rivers, which is compounded by the effects of Hurricane Floyd just weeks later. Damage in the state amounts to over $50 million.
- September 16, 1999 – Hurricane Floyd strikes near Cape Fear with a 10-foot (3 m) storm surge and wind gusts of up to 122 mph (196 km/h); the hurricane drops heavy rainfall of over 20 inches (500 mm), which causes record-breaking river flooding that is considered a 1 in 500 year event. Damage amounts to over $3 billion (1999 USD, $3.7 billion 2007 USD), with over 7,000 homes destroyed and another 56,000 damaged. The passage of the hurricane causes 35 direct deaths and 16 indirect deaths in the state, primarily from flooding. Governor Jim Hunt considers the hurricane "the worst disaster to hit North Carolina in modern times."
- September 21, 1999 – Tropical Storm Harvey crosses southern Florida, with its moisture producing light rainfall along the North Carolina coastline.
- October 18, 1999 – Hurricane Irene parallels the state's coastline just offshore, dropping further heavy rainfall to coastal regions. Some additional flooding is reported, and one indirect death occurs due to a traffic accident.

== Monthly statistics ==
Number of recorded storms affecting North Carolina
| Month | Number of storms |
|---|---|
| June | 5 |
| July | 9 |
| August | 16 |
| September | 20 |
| October | 13 |
| November | 5 |

== Deadly storms ==
Total deaths
| Name | Year | Number of deaths | |
| Name | Year | Direct | Indirect |
|---|---|---|---|
| Bob | 1985 | 0 | 1 |
| Gloria | 1985 | 1 | 0 |
| Andrew | 1986 | 1 | 0 |
| Charley | 1986 | 0 | 1 |
| Bob | 1991 | 0 | 1 |
| Luis | 1995 | 1 | 0 |
| Bonnie | 1998 | 1 | 0 |
| Irene | 1999 | 0 | 1 |
| Emily | 1993 | 2 | 0 |
| Opal | 1995 | 1 | 1 |
| Bertha | 1996 | 1 | 1 |
| Danny | 1997 | 2 | 0 |
| Diana | 1984 | 0 | 3 |
| Felix | 1995 | 3 | 0 |
| Marco | 1990 | 2 | 2 |
| Charley | 1980 | 0 | 6 |
| Hugo | 1989 | 1 | 6 |
| Fran | 1996 | 6 | 8 |
| Floyd | 1999 | 35 | 16 |

== See also ==
- List of North Carolina hurricanes
- Geography of North Carolina
