= 1990 hurricane season =

1990 hurricane season may refer to:

- The 1990 Atlantic hurricane season
- The 1990 Pacific hurricane season
