= Hurricane Diana =

Category 2 Atlantic and Pacific hurricane in 1990

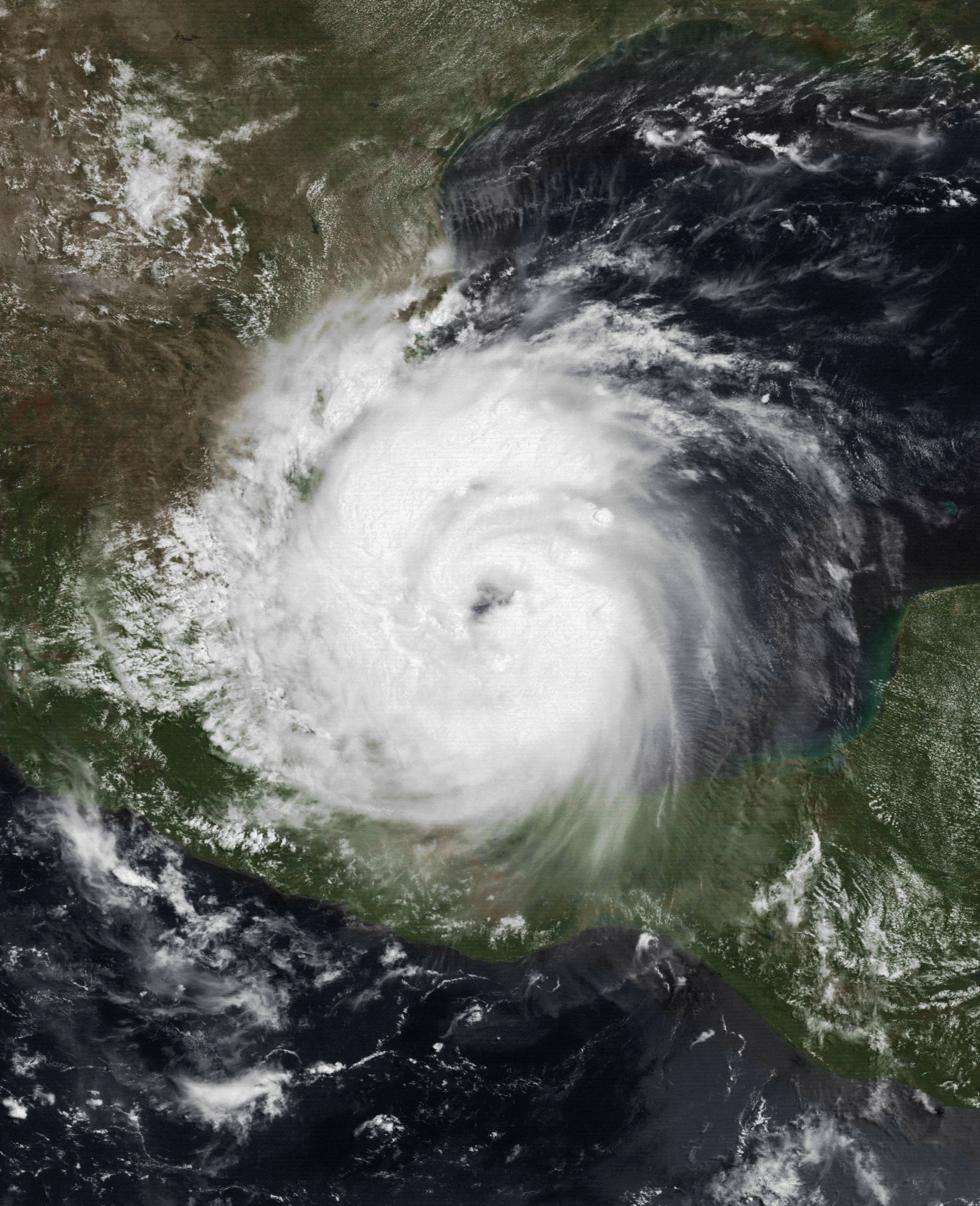
- Diana at peak intensity near landfall in Mexico on August 7

Meteorological history
- Formed: August 4, 1990
- Dissipated: August 9, 1990

Category 2 hurricane
- 1-minute sustained (SSHWS/NWS)
- Highest winds: 100 mph (155 km/h)
- Lowest pressure: 980 mbar (hPa); 28.94 inHg

Overall effects
- Fatalities: 139
- Damage: $90.7 million (1990 USD)
- Areas affected: Costa Rica, Nicaragua, Honduras, Belize, Yucatán Peninsula, Mexico
- IBTrACS
- Part of the 1990 Atlantic and Pacific hurricane seasons

Hurricane Diana was a deadly tropical cyclone which made landfall in Mexico in August 1990. The fourth named storm and second hurricane of the season, Diana developed from a tropical wave in the southwestern Caribbean on August 4. Forming as a tropical depression, the system brushed Honduras before intensifying into a tropical storm the following day. Continuing to gradually strengthen, Diana made its first landfall in Mexico's Yucatán Peninsula as a strong tropical storm late on August 5. The cyclone weakened slightly due to land interaction, before emerging into the Bay of Campeche on August 6. Once over water, warm sea surface temperatures allowed Diana to quickly become a hurricane and later peak as a Category 2 on the Saffir–Simpson hurricane scale on August 7. Shortly thereafter, the storm made landfall near Tampico, Tamaulipas, with winds of 160 km/h (100 mph). Rapid weakening ensued once the storm moved over the high terrain of Mexico, with Diana diminishing to a tropical depression roughly 24 hours after moving onshore. The cyclone later emerged into the Gulf of California on August 9 shortly before dissipating. The remnant disturbance was monitored until losing its identity over Arizona on August 14.

Diana left relatively minor impacts in the Yucatán Peninsula. Some locations observed tropical storm-force sustained winds and gusts, while heavy rains left street flooding in the Chetumal area. Along the Gulf Coast of Mexico, the hurricane produced torrential rains exceeding 510 mm (20 in) in some places. The ensuing floods left about 3,500 people homeless and destroyed roughly 400 km^{2} (155 mi^{2}) of farmland. Numerous roads and railways were either washed out or blocked by debris, cutting communication with several communities. In all, Diana killed 139 people in Mexico and resulted in approximately $90.7 million (1990 USD) in damage. The remnant disturbance caused street flooding in Arizona.

== Meteorological history ==
Map plotting the storm's track and intensity, according to the Saffir–Simpson scale Map key Saffir–Simpson scale Tropical depression (≤38 mph, ≤62 km/h) Tropical storm (39–73 mph, 63–118 km/h) Category 1 (74–95 mph, 119–153 km/h) Category 2 (96–110 mph, 154–177 km/h) Category 3 (111–129 mph, 178–208 km/h) Category 4 (130–156 mph, 209–251 km/h) Category 5 (≥157 mph, ≥252 km/h) Unknown Storm type Tropical cyclone Subtropical cyclone Extratropical cyclone, remnant low, tropical disturbance, or monsoon depression

Hurricane Diana originated from a tropical wave which emerged into the Atlantic Ocean from the west coast of Africa on July 27. Unfavorable conditions initially prohibited tropical cyclogenesis, with the wave remaining disorganized until reaching the eastern Caribbean Sea. The system entered the Caribbean Sea through the southern Windward Islands, where barometric pressures fell slightly, decreasing by 3.5 mbar (hPa; 0.1 inHg) in 24 hours. Upper-level air data from the Lesser Antilles indicated that the tropical wave was associated with an upper-level anticyclone. The first reconnaissance aircraft flight into the wave indicated no low-level circulation, but a relatively large and increasing amount of thunderstorm activity. The system continued to have a large amount of associated convection while passing over the Netherlands Antilles, as indicated by satellite images and surface observations. After satellite imagery observed a cyclonic rotation in the low-level convection, the fifth tropical depression of the season developed over the Caribbean around 00:00 UTC on August 4, while located about 125 mi (200 km) east of Isla de Providencia. However, this was based on surface observations, and the formation of a tropical cyclone operationally remained unconfirmed until another reconnaissance aircraft flight later that day.

The depression initially moved to the northwest under the influence of a mid-level trough. Around 00:00 UTC on August 5, about 24 hours after developing, the cyclone intensified into a tropical storm while offshore northeastern Honduras; the National Hurricane Center assigned the name Diana to the system. Diana would subsequently strengthen further, with winds reaching 65 mph (105 km/h) before the storm made landfall near Felipe Carrillo Puerto, Quintana Roo, around 20:00 UTC later that day. The storm weakened while crossing the Yucatán Peninsula, and emerged into the Bay of Campeche early on August 6 with winds of 50 mph (80 km/h). Upon entering the Bay of Campeche, Diana began moving nearly due west as a result of a weakening trough of low pressure. With conditions being more favorable in the Bay of Campeche, Diana quickly intensified, becoming a hurricane around 06:00 UTC on August 7. Twelve hours later, the cyclone intensified into a Category 2 hurricane and attained its peak intensity with maximum sustained winds of 100 mph (160 km/h) and a minimum barometric pressure of 980 mbar (hPa; 28.94 inHg). At 19:00 UTC on August 7, just one hour after attaining peak intensity, Diana made landfall in Tamiahua, Tamaulipas, at the same intensity.

Moving inland, Diana rapidly weakened over the high terrain of Mexico, quickly deteriorating from a low-end Category 2 hurricane to a strong tropical storm by 00:00 UTC on August 8. The system continued westward and weakened to a tropical depression roughly 12 hours later while centered near Mexico City. The weakening tropical depression turned west-northwestward over central Mexico and emerged into the Pacific Ocean on August 9, before dissipating as a tropical cyclone over the Gulf of California. The remnants of Diana curved northward around the eastern periphery of an upper-cyclone and tracked through the Gulf of California. Convection flared up before the remnant disturbance moved ashore in northwestern Sonora. The remnants of Diana entered Arizona and dissipated by early on August 14.

== Preparations ==
In anticipation of Diana's first landfall, a tropical storm warning was issued on August 5 for Cancún, Mexico, southward to Belize City, Belize, on August 5, including the offshore islands from both nations; a tropical storm warning indicates that tropical storm force winds, 39 to 73 mph (63 to 117 km/h), are expected within 24 hours. Eleven hours later, the tropical storm warning was extended as far as Carmen, but was discontinued for the entire east coast of Belize. Civil defense officials in Quintana Roo recommended that residents in coastal areas and in homes with weak construction to evacuate. The civil defense also set up emergency shelters in Punta Allen, Punta Herrero, and Xcalak. The Mexican Coast Guard was placed on alert and shipping activity around Quintana Roo ceased during the evening of August 5, as tides were expected to range from 3 to 5 ft (0.91 to 1.52 m) above normal. Additionally, officials expressed concerns about flash flooding due to the possibility of 5 to 8 in (130 to 200 mm) of rainfall in areas near the storm's path. After Diana made landfall on the Yucatán Peninsula on August 6, all of the tropical storm warnings in place were discontinued.

Diana then threatened the mainland east coast of Mexico. A hurricane watch was issued for Tuxpan to Boca de Jesus Maria at 21:00 UTC on August 6; a hurricane watch notes the possibility of hurricane conditions within 48 hours, such as winds of at least 74 mph (119 km/h). Early on August 7, the National Hurricane Center anticipated hurricane conditions within 24 hours, and as a result, a hurricane warning was issued for Nautla to Le Pesca. Simultaneously, a tropical storm warning was issued for La Pesca to Boca de Jesus Maria. Later that day, a hurricane warning had been issued for a similar area, stretching from Nautla to Lerdo de Tejada. The National Hurricane Center also predicted precipitation totals of 8 in (200 mm) and emphasized that flash floods and mudslides would likely occurred in the vicinity of where Diana was projected to make landfall. According to Miguelangel Rebolledo, the captain of the port of Tuxpan, about 300 people fled low-lying areas. State and federal officials prepared 10,000 packages of emergency supplies, food, and medicine and moved them to several locations along the coast. Police and Armed Forces were placed on alert. By 00:00 UTC on August 8, all of the watches and warnings in place were officially discontinued.

== Impact ==
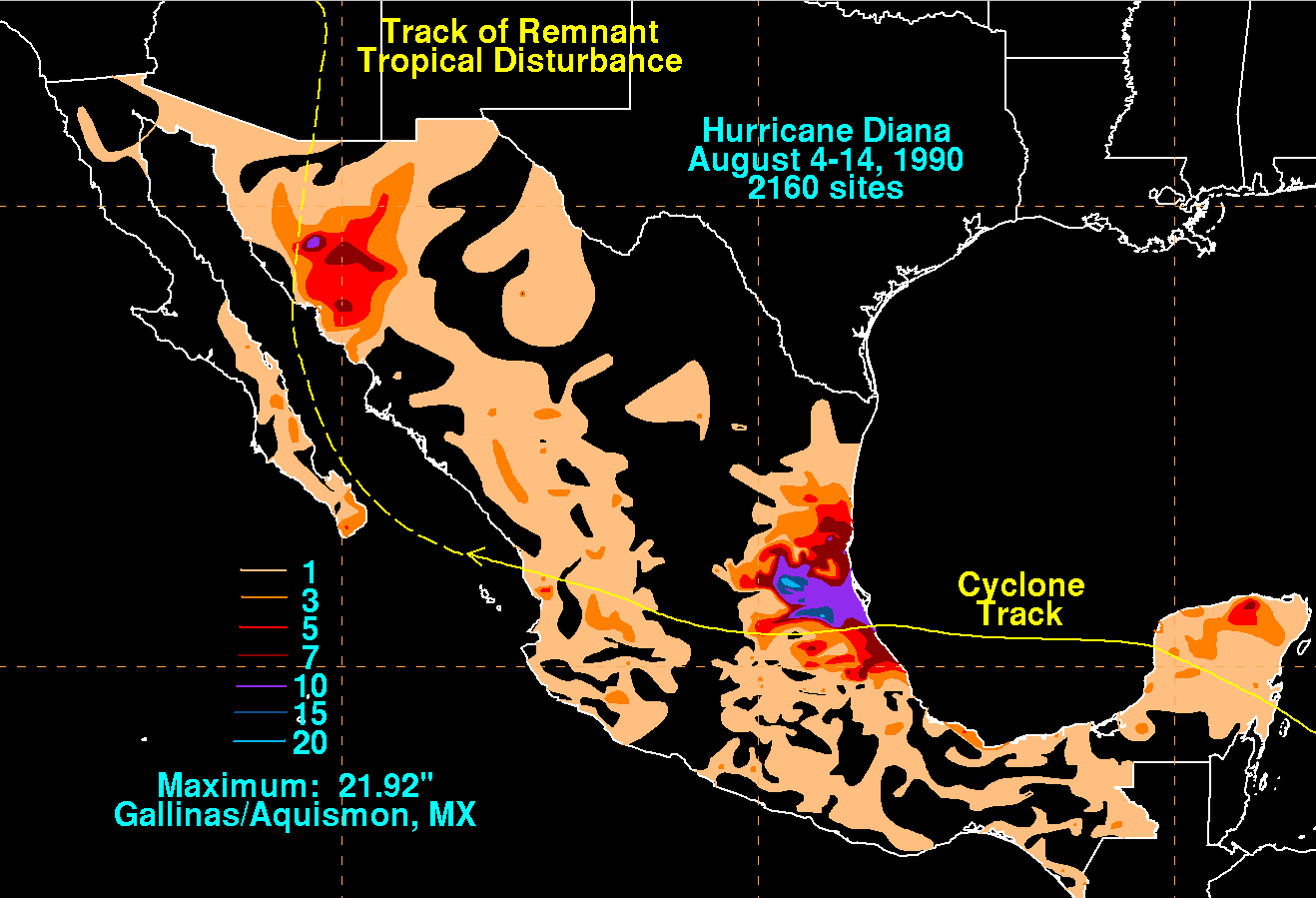
Rainfall from Diana in Mexico

=== Mexico ===
Offshore Quintana Roo, the island of Cozumel reported sustained winds of 45 mph (72 km/h). While crossing over the Yucatán Peninsula, sustained winds of 34 mph (55 km/h) and gusts to 40 mph (64 km/h) were observed in Mérida. In addition, wind gusts of 37 and 45 mph (60 and 72 km/h) were reported in the towns of Felipe Carrillo Puerto and José María Morelos, respectively. Diana also caused heavy rain across the area, though damage is unknown. Due to heavy rainfall, minor street flooding occurred in Chetumal, Quintana Roo.

Along the Gulf of Mexico, the storm produced storm surge and abnormally high tides, with waves up to 12 ft (3.7 m) in height. Rough seas resulted in the closures of the ports at Coatzacoalcos and Tampico. Diana produced torrential rainfall while crossing the country, which peaked at 21.92 in (557 mm) in Aquismón, San Luis Potosí. Heavy rainfall triggered mudslides and flooding, mostly in the east-central portion of Mexico. The Comisión Nacional del Agua noted that at least seven rivers in the lower Pánuco River basin threatened to overflow their banks in the states of Guanajuato, Jalisco, San Luis Potosí, and Tamaulipas. The rainfall caused extensive property damage, destroying numerous houses and leaving 3,500 homeless. Flooding inundated highways and railways across six states and destroyed about 155 mi^{2} (400 km^{2}) of farmland.

The states of Veracruz, Hidalgo, and Puebla were hardest hit, with over 75,000 people affected by the hurricane. In Poza Rica, high winds toppled trees and electricity poles, which cut off telephone services and electricity supply to the city. Fallen trees and telephone wires also blocked some streets in the area, but the major roads remained open. Farther south, flooding left Federal Highway 185 impassable near Coatzacoalcos for a few days. Approximately 80% of apple, coffee, peach, and pear crops were lost in the municipality of Huayacocotla. In Pánuco, flooding forced more than 2,000 families to flee their homes. Diana caused at least 20 deaths and left 18 people missing in the city. Local crops experienced significant damage, especially cotton, rice, and soybeans. Throughout the state of Veracruz, the storm destroyed about 99,000 acres (40,000 ha) of banana, citrus, corn, and cotton crops.

In Hidalgo, several miners died after their truck plunged into a ravine. The San Juan River overflowed in the town of Huejutla de Reyes, sweeping away hundreds of homes and some people in one neighborhood. Diana also damaged at least 110 schools and 25 public buildings throughout in Hidalgo. Flooding washed out or damaged four federal highways and six state highways. The agricultural industry in Hidalgo, which had not fully recovered from a severe frost in December 1988, experienced significant effects. About 220,000 acres (90,000 ha) of croplands suffered damage, mainly impacting coffee, rice, and bean crops.

Excluding the 56 people still missing by the end of 1990, Diana caused at least 139 deaths and $90.7 million in damage. However, some sources claim that there were as much as 391 fatalities and losses incurred by the storm totaled to $94.5 million. In addition, it is estimated that Diana injured 25,000 people.

=== Elsewhere ===
While Diana was crossing the Yucatán Peninsula, it dropped light rainfall in Belize, peaking at 1 in (25 mm) in an unspecified location. The remnants of Hurricane Diana eventually moved into the Southwestern United States, bringing heavy rainfall to the region. In Imperial County, California, golf-ball sized hail was reported by the residents, along with rain and lightning, causing brief power outages throughout the county. A police dispatch of Imperial County also noted local flooding, which resulted in traffic disruptions. The remnants of Diana also dropped light rainfall in San Diego County, California, with the city of San Diego receiving only a trace of rain, Vista reporting 0.09 inches (2.3 mm), Del Mar had 0.08 inches (2.0 mm), and Oceanside measuring 0.3 inches (7.6 mm).

In Arizona, the remnants of Diana contributed to record cold temperatures for August in Phoenix. On August 14, the city had a high temperature of 78 °F (26 °C), which was 24 °F (−4 °C) below normal for that date. In Maricopa County, 3.5 in (89 mm) of rain was observed. Heavy precipitation, with 3.42 in (87 mm) in Desert Hills, which fell in less than two hours. Several weather-related car accidents occurred, but none were serious. In Apache Junction, police and city officials rushed to close flooded streets, including portions of state highways and underpasses of Interstate 17. Crews were pumping 32,000 US gal (120,000 L) of water from the underpasses of Interstate 17, but their efforts were futile. A 19 mi (31 km) portion of State Route 87 between Gila River Indian Community and the intersection with State Route 187 was shut down due to flooding. In Sacaton, about two-thirds of the city was inundated with at least 3 ft (0.91 m) of water.

== Aftermath ==
Following the storm, the Mexican Armed Forces delivered food and basic health care supplies to victims. In addition, there was also a mass vaccination against typhoid. Officials delivered about 8,000 boxes of blankets, clothing, and food in total to the 55 worst impacted communities in Veracruz. The Mexican Army and Civil Defense of Veracruz deployed 36 medical brigades to attend to those injured during the storm. By August 11, 120 families in the Sierra Norte de Puebla region of Puebla had received construction materials to rebuild their homes.

Due to the storm's impact, the name Diana was retired by the World Meteorological Organization in the spring of 1991, and will never be used again for another Atlantic hurricane. It was replaced with Dolly for the 1996 season.

== See also ==
- List of Category 2 Atlantic hurricanes
- List of Atlantic–Pacific crossover hurricanes
- Hurricane Debby (1988) – A Category 1 hurricane that impacted similar areas
- Hurricane Gert (1993) – A Category 2 hurricane that impacted similar areas
- Hurricane Stan (2005) – A Category 1 hurricane that impacted similar areas
- Hurricane Karl (2010) – A Category 3 hurricane that impacted similar areas
- Hurricane Franklin (2017) – A Category 1 hurricane that impacted similar areas
