= Tropical Storm Marco (1990) =

Atlantic tropical storm

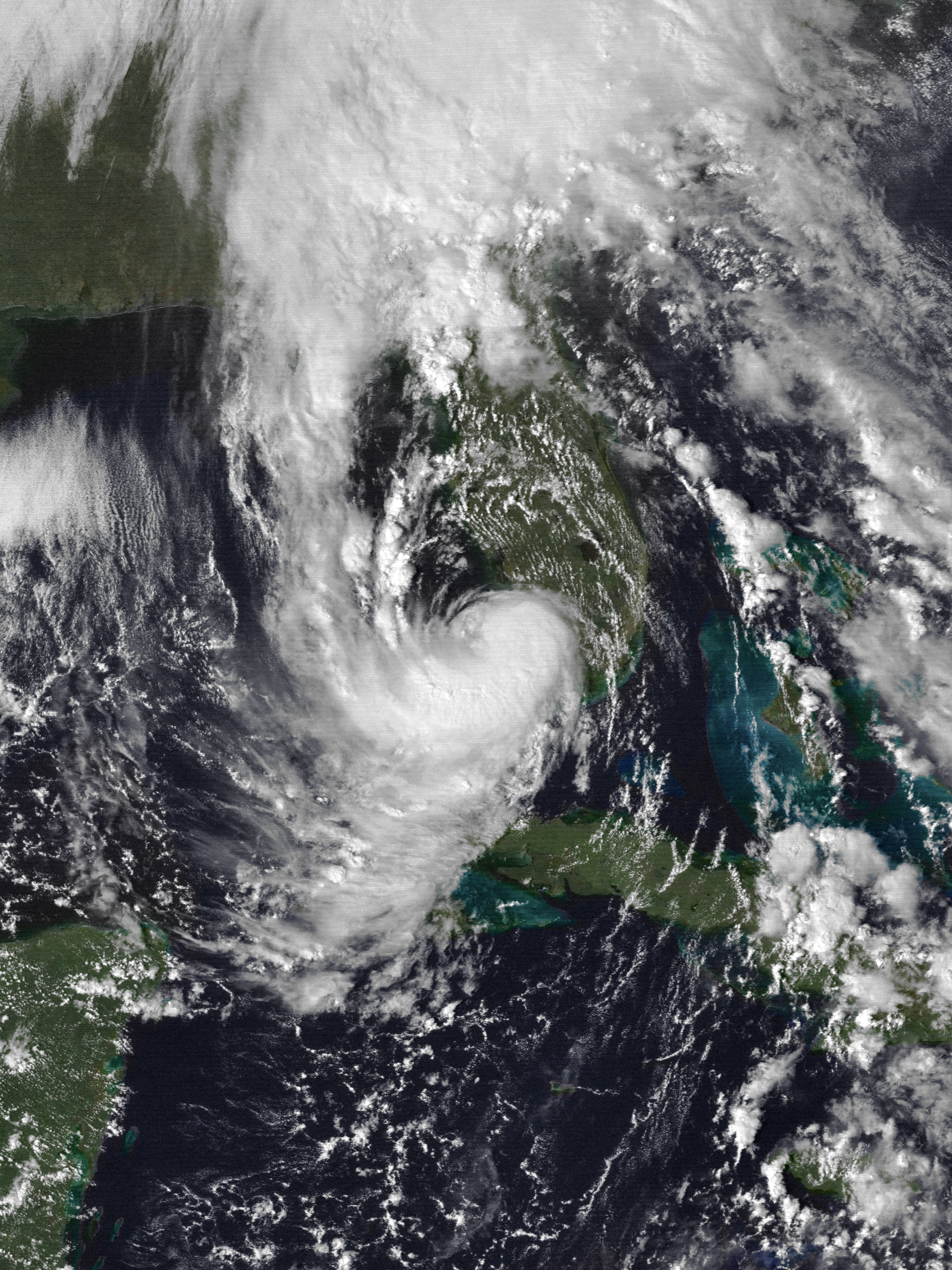
- Marco over the Florida Keys on October 10

Meteorological history
- Formed: October 9, 1990
- Extratropical: October 12, 1990
- Dissipated: October 13, 1990

Tropical storm
- 1-minute sustained (SSHWS/NWS)
- Highest winds: 65 mph (100 km/h)
- Lowest pressure: 989 mbar (hPa); 29.21 inHg

Overall effects
- Fatalities: 12 total
- Damage: $57 million (1990 USD)
- Areas affected: Florida, Georgia, The Carolinas, East Coast of the United States
- IBTrACS
- Part of the 1990 Atlantic hurricane season

Tropical Storm Marco was the only tropical cyclone to make landfall on the United States during the 1990 Atlantic hurricane season. The 13th named storm of the season, Marco formed from a cold-core low pressure area along the northern coast of Cuba on October 9, and tracked northwestward through the eastern Gulf of Mexico. With most of its circulation over the western portion of Florida, Tropical Storm Marco produced 65 mph (105 km/h) winds over land. However, it weakened to a tropical depression before moving ashore near Cedar Key. The cyclone combined with a cold front and the remnants of Hurricane Klaus to produce heavy rainfall in Georgia and the Carolinas. After interacting with the nearby Hurricane Lili, Marco continued northward until being absorbed by a cold front on October 13.

In Florida, the cyclone triggered flooding of some houses and roadways. Rainfall across its path peaked at 19.89 inches (505 mm) in Louisville, Georgia, though several locations received over 10 inches (250 mm) of precipitation. The flooding caused a total of 12 deaths, mostly due to drowning, as well as $57 million in damage (1990 USD, 140 million 2026 USD).

== Meteorological history ==
Map plotting the storm's track and intensity, according to the Saffir–Simpson scale Map key Saffir–Simpson scale Tropical depression (≤38 mph, ≤62 km/h) Tropical storm (39–73 mph, 63–118 km/h) Category 1 (74–95 mph, 119–153 km/h) Category 2 (96–110 mph, 154–177 km/h) Category 3 (111–129 mph, 178–208 km/h) Category 4 (130–156 mph, 209–251 km/h) Category 5 (≥157 mph, ≥252 km/h) Unknown Storm type Tropical cyclone Subtropical cyclone Extratropical cyclone, remnant low, tropical disturbance, or monsoon depression

By early on October 6, a low pressure area and circulation persisted over eastern Cuba in the middle levels of the atmosphere. The low drifted westward, and interacted with Hurricane Klaus to its east. Initially cold-core in nature, the system gradually built downward to the surface, and on October 9, the low developed a low-level circulation; at 1200 UTC the National Hurricane Center classified it as Tropical Depression Fifteen while located near the Cuban city of Caibarién, though the cyclone was initially subtropical in character. To its east, Tropical Storm Klaus continued to weaken; the depression absorbed most of Klaus and became the dominant system. The storm tracked parallel to the coast of Cuba before veering northward and crossing the Florida Keys, where it intensified into Tropical Storm Marco about 35 mi (56 km) south-southeast of Key West, Florida.

Tropical Storm Marco at peak intensity straddling the west coast of Florida on October 11

After passing midway between Key West and the Dry Tortugas, Tropical Storm Marco adopted a steady northward track and quickly intensified, reaching peak winds of 65 mph (105 km/h) on October 11, while still southwest of Englewood, Florida. The center of the storm continued on its off-shore parallel for another six hours after reaching its peak intensity, until it reached a position about six mi (10 km) west of Bradenton Beach; although the center of the storm remained offshore, much of its circulation was over land. Initially the storm still was forecast to move ashore between Fort Myers and Sarasota. However, the cyclone continued its northward trajectory, the center remaining offshore, and it weakened to a tropical depression prior to making landfall near Cedar Key early on October 12.

After landfall, the cyclone accelerated in forward speed northward, weakening in intensity, and, by 1200 UTC on October 12, Marco became an extra-tropical cyclone. It turned to the northeast and east through South Carolina, following behind Hurricane Lili to its northeast. For a time, the system's proximity to Lili resulted in hints of the Fujiwhara effect, in which two tropical cyclone appear to rotate around each other. The cold front that absorbed the weakening low was to the storm's north on October 13, though moisture from the remnants of Marco dropped heavy rainfall across the southeast United States for another day.

== Preparations ==
A tropical storm warning was issued at some point during the existence of the cyclone for the west coast of Florida from Key West to Apalachicola. Additionally, a tropical storm warning was put in place for the east coast from Vero Beach northward to Fernandina Beach. Before the arrival of Marco, elementary schools were closed on the three barrier islands in Lee County. Florida governor Bob Martinez ordered the closure of state offices in the Tampa Bay area, and also decided not to open the University of South Florida and nearby community colleges. Public schools were not opened on the day of the storm's passage in Manatee and Sarasota counties, though most other schools remained open. As the storm tracked northward, the National Weather Service issued a flood watch for much of Georgia. A flood watch was later issued for western portions of the Carolinas and for high elevations in Virginia and West Virginia.

== Impact ==
=== Florida ===
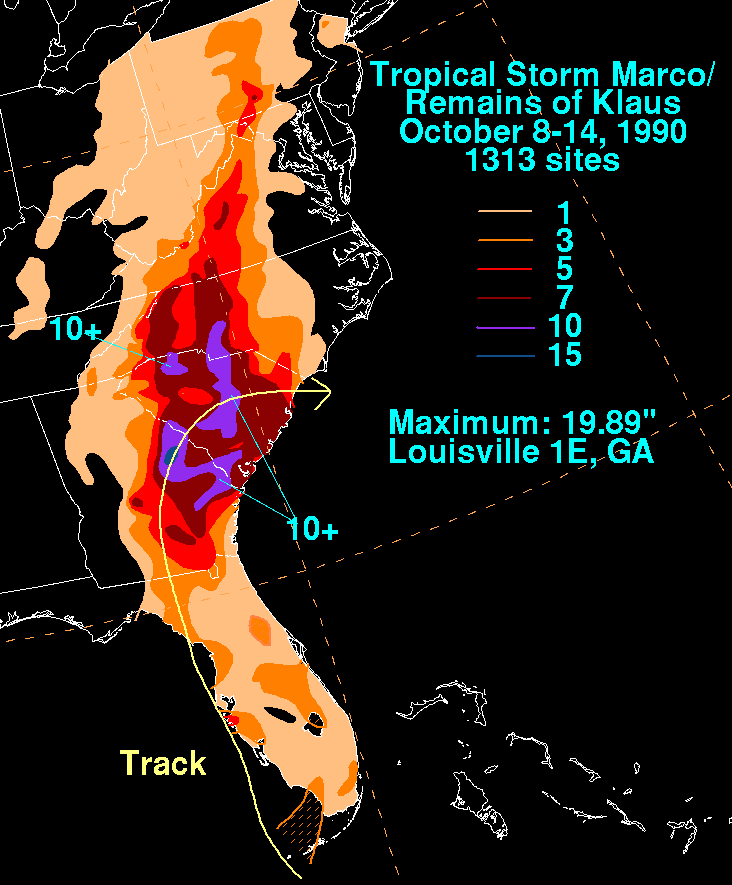
Rainfall summary for Tropical Storm Marco

With most of its circulation over the western portion of Florida during its existence, Tropical Storm Marco produced 39–74 mph winds across western Florida. As it brushed the coastline, the storm developed strong convective rain bands, leading to peak sustained winds of 69 mph (111 km/h) with gusts to 85 mph (137 km/h) on the Sunshine Skyway Bridge; the bridge was closed after gusts reached 70 mph (113 km/h). Squalls from the storm spawned four tornadoes in the state, one of which struck the city of Crystal River, destroying a mobile home and leaving 2,000 people without power for about an hour. Storm damage left about 25,000 customers across the state without power and about 40 families temporarily homeless.

Paralleling the coastline, the storm produced a light storm surge that peaked at 2.6 feet (0.79 m) above normal on Sanibel Island. In some locations, the surge rose rapidly, and, despite the unusual geography of the area, the levels varied only by as much as 9.8 inches (250 mm) than the predicted levels from the SLOSH model. The surge and waves caused minor beach erosion. Moderate to heavy rainfall fell across western Florida, peaking at 6.14 inches (156 mm) near Bradenton; the rainfall was beneficial after a very dry summer, though, because it fell quickly, even this amount of precipitation failed to relieve water restrictions across the area. The storm resulted in some flooding in its path, including some several homes in Manatee County, roadways, and two U.S. highways. Statewide damage totalled $3 million (1990 USD, 7.39 million 2026 USD), of which $1 million (1990 USD, 2.46 million 2026 USD) occurred in Manatee County.

=== Elsewhere ===
As the remnants of Marco entered Georgia, they combined with the remnant moisture from Hurricane Klaus and a slow-moving cold front, which caused large amounts of precipitation to fall across the eastern portion of the state. Rainfall peaked at 19.89 inches (505 mm) at a weather station near Louisville, Georgia where over 16 inches (410 mm) fell in a 24‑hour period. In Augusta, 2.79 inches (71 mm) of rainfall fell in one hour, which forced the evacuation of about 300 people. Augusta National Golf Club's famed Amen Corner was damaged, especially hole 11 (White Dogwood), which "floated off the golf course" after Rae's Creek overflowed. The club rebuilt the greens and the course was fully restored in time for the 1991 Masters Tournament the next April. Some roads in eastern Georgia were flooded up to 6 feet (1.8 m) deep, and police officers in Augusta rescued people in flooded cars. The flooding resulted in some power outages. In the deluge, five people drowned, and 450 were left homeless. The remnants of the storm spawned a tornado in Brantley County, which destroyed 25 unoccupied homes. Damage in Georgia totaled $42 million (1990 USD, 104 million 2026 USD). On October 19, 1990, President George H. W. Bush declared several counties in Georgia as federal disaster areas, which permitted the use of emergency funds for victims.

Heavy rainfall continued northward into the Carolinas. Much of South Carolina experienced over 7 inches (180 mm) of precipitation; statewide, the rainfall peaked at 13.96 inches (355 mm) in Pageland. The highest totals in 100 years in some locations also ended a severe drought. In the flooding, 80 bridges in the state failed; in total, more than 120 bridges were either closed, damaged, or destroyed. In South Carolina, the system caused three drowning deaths; damage totaled $12 million ($1990, 29.6 million 2026 USD). In North Carolina, rainfall reached 10.74 inches (273 mm) in Albemarle. The storm directly caused two deaths in North Carolina, and indirectly caused two traffic deaths.

Rainfall from the combined remnants of Marco and Klaus extended into the Ohio Valley, with 3.67 inches (93 mm) recorded near Mountain City, Tennessee. Totals of 2–5 inches (51–127 millimetres) spread across northwest Virginia, western Maryland, eastern West Virginia, and the Susquehanna Valley of Pennsylvania. In New York, the rainfall combined with moisture from Hurricane Lili, which triggered flooding that closed a portion of a railway line and a highway.

== See also ==
- Other storms of the same name
- List of Florida hurricanes
- List of North Carolina hurricanes (1980–1999)
