= List of New York hurricanes =

List of American regional weather events

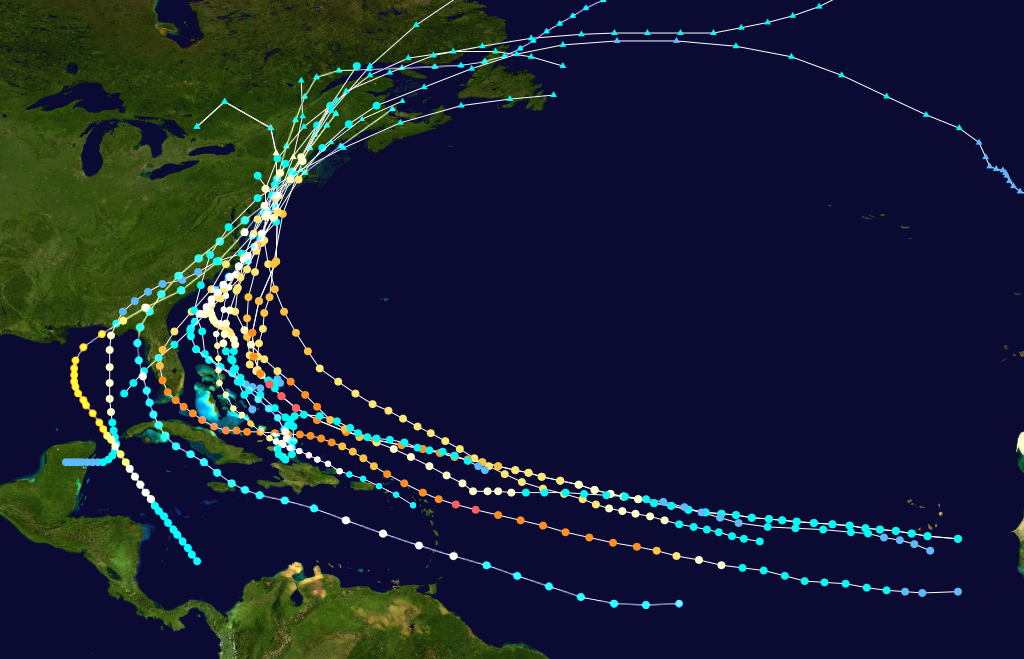
Track map of all tropical cyclones known to have made landfall in the state of New York.

Since the 17th century, 175 subtropical or tropical cyclones have affected the U.S. State of New York. The state of New York is located along the East Coast of the United States, in the Northeastern portion of the country. The strongest of these storms was the 1938 New England hurricane, which struck Long Island as a Category 3 storm on the Saffir–Simpson hurricane scale. Killing more than 60 people, it was also the deadliest. Tropical cyclones have affected the state primarily in September but have also hit during every month of the hurricane season and on rare occasions in the off-season. Tropical cyclones rarely make landfall in the state, although it is common for Post-tropical cyclones to produce heavy rainfall and flash flooding either in the NYC metropolitan area, Long Island, or Upstate New York. Tropical cyclones that are offshore the East Coast of the United States or in the open Atlantic are known to also produce rip currents, gusty winds, beach erosion, and coastal flooding, along the New York coastline. The most recent storm to affect the state was Subtropical Storm Josephine in 2026.

== Before 1600 ==
- Between 1278 and 1438: A major hurricane is believed to have struck the modern-day New York/New Jersey area.

== 1600–1799 ==
- October 29, 1693: The Great Storm of 1693 causes severe damage on Long Island, and is reported to have created the Fire Island Cut as a result of the coast-changing storm surge and waves occurred.
- September 23, 1785: Several large ships crash into Governors Island as a result of powerful waves which are reported to have been generated by a tropical cyclone.
- August 19, 1788: A hurricane struck New York City, New Jersey or Long Island and is reported to have left the west side of the Battery "laid in ruins" after severe flooding occurs.

== 1800–1899 ==
=== 1804 ===
- October 9, 1804: Heavy snow falls in Eastern New York peaking at 30 inches (75 cm) as a hurricane tracks northward along the East Coast and becomes extratropical, as cold air fed into the system.

=== 1815 ===
- September 5, 1815: A hurricane tracks over North Carolina and parallels the East Coast before producing a heavy rainstorm in New York.
- September 24, 1815: Several hundred trees fall and the majority of the fruit was stripped off apple trees just prior to harvesting time after a hurricane makes landfall on Long Island.

=== 1816 ===
- September 16, 1816: A possible hurricane strikes New York City, but damage remains unknown.

=== 1817 ===
- August 9, 1817: A tropical storm produces heavy rainfall in New York City and Long Island.

=== 1821 ===
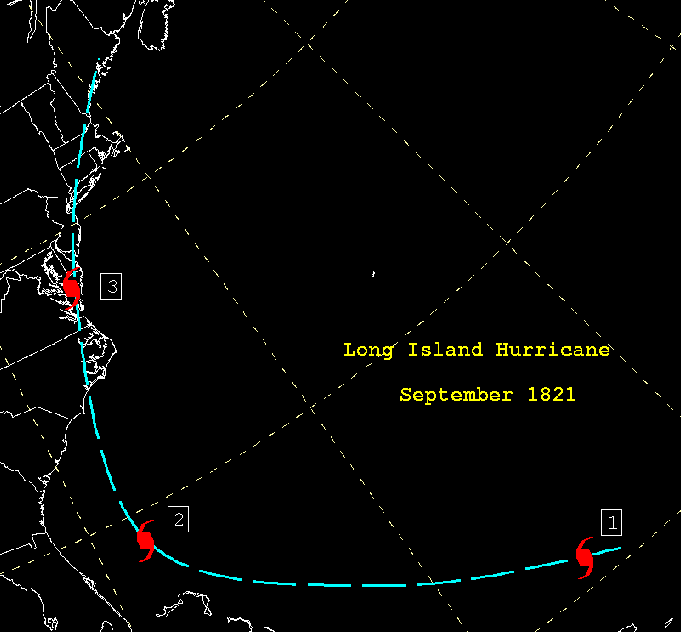
Estimated track of the 1821 Norfolk and Long Island hurricane

- September 3, 1821: The 1821 Norfolk and Long Island hurricane makes landfall in New York City, resulting in severe damage on Long Island. The hurricane produced an extraordinarily high storm surge of 13 feet (4 m) in just an hour in Battery Park. Along Long Island, high winds destroyed several buildings and left crops destroyed. The death toll in the state reached 17 when high winds caused a ship to crash off Long Island.

=== 1825 ===
- June 4, 1825: A hurricane moves off the East Coast and tracks south of New York causing several ship wrecks, and killing seven people.

=== 1827 ===
- August 27, 1827: High tides are reported in New York City which are caused by a hurricane offshore.

=== 1830 ===
- August 1, 1830: A hurricane passes to the east of New York and produces gale-force winds to New York City and Long Island.

=== 1841 ===
- October 4, 1841: Gale–force winds affect New York City as a hurricane tracks north along the East Coast of the United States. Damage is estimated at $2 million (1841 USD, $41 million 2007 USD).

=== 1846 ===
- October 13, 1846: The Great Havana Hurricane of 1846 treks inland the state, leading to significant damage in NYC and more minor damage in Upstate New York. The waters of Upper New York Bay crashed over the Battery Park sea wall, washing away 300 ft (91 m) of its length. Gusts caved in chimneys, uprooted trees, and sank several canal boats at the city's wharves. At Buffalo, a rupture along the Erie Canal interrupted nearby traffic, and to the east in Dansville.

=== 1849 ===
- October 6, 1849: Severe structural damage occurs in New York City and Long Island with the passage of a hurricane to the east.

=== 1850 ===
- July 19, 1850: A hurricane destroys a Coney Island bath house and causes heavy rain, although damage is unknown. This storm destroyed the ship Elizabeth off Fire Island and drowned American transcendentalist Margaret Fuller.
- August 24, 1850: A storm that is reported to be a hurricane affects New York and New England although there is no known damage.

=== 1854 ===
- September 9, 1854: A hurricane brushes the East Coast from Florida to New England causing rain on Long Island.

=== 1858 ===
- September 16, 1858: Low barometric pressure of 28.87 inches mercury at Sag Harbor is reported, and is thought to be associated with a tropical cyclone which causes no known damage.

=== 1869 ===
- September 6, 1869: A Category 3 hurricane makes landfall in Rhode Island and brushes Long Island, which is affected by rain, although minimal damage resulted from the storm.

=== 1872 ===
- October 28, 1872: A tropical storm passes over New York City and Long Island.

=== 1874 ===
- October 1, 1874: New York City and the Hudson Valley receives rainfall after a minimal tropical storm tracked over Eastern New York.

=== 1876 ===
- September 19, 1876: The remnants of the San Felipe hurricane trek over western New York State, although damage is unknown.

=== 1878 ===
- October 24, 1878: The state is affected by tropical storm-force winds and heavy rain with the passage of a hurricane, which made landfall in Virginia.

=== 1888 ===
- August 22, 1888: A tropical storm moves into New York City before tracking north along the East Coast of the United States.

=== 1893 ===
- August 24, 1893: Hog Island is washed away by strong storm surge associated with a tropical storm of unknown strength. According to HURDAT, this was a Category 1 hurricane that struck the western end of the Rockaway Peninsula, passing through Brooklyn as a weakening hurricane. Manhattan Island saw gale-force winds to 56 mph (90 km/h). In total, the hurricane itself capsized or beached numerous ships and vessels in the vicinity of New York City, leading to 34 reported fatalities. “Hundreds of thousands” of dollars in damage occurred in New York City.
- August 29, 1893: The Sea Islands hurricane moves through the Hudson Valley as a tropical storm. Lives were lost in the Rockaways and when tow boats were destroyed at various points along the Hudson River. Roofs, structures, boats and crops were destroyed or damaged from Brooklyn to as far west as Dunkirk. Wind gusts of 54 mph and 57 mph (87 km/h and 92 km/h) were recorded in New York and Albany respectively.

=== 1894 ===
- October 10, 1894: A strong Category 1 hurricane makes landfall on Long Island with 1-minute sustained winds of 85 mph (140 km/h). 10 people were killed and 15 injured at 74 Monroe Street in Manhattan when winds blew a building under construction onto a tenement crushing it. Extensive damage in the NYC and Long Island to telegraph lines, trees and boats docked on shore. Storm formed over Gulf of Mexico as a Category 3 weakened over land in the Southeast and re strengthened to a Category 1 over the Chesapeake Bay before striking Long Island.

== 1900–1949 ==
=== 1900 ===
- September 12, 1900 – Remnants of the Galveston hurricane brought tropical storm conditions to New York City and Brooklyn killing one person and damaging property.

=== 1903 ===
- September 17, 1903: The 1903 Vagabond Hurricane produces wind gusts in excess of 65 mph (105 km/h) and 3 inches (75 mm) of rain in Central Park. One person died in New York City as a result from the storm.

=== 1904 ===
- August 15, 1904: A Category 2 hurricane skirts the East Coast of the United States producing gale-force winds and heavy rain in Eastern New York and Long Island.

=== 1908 ===
- May 30, 1908: A rare pre-season hurricane makes landfall on Long Island, New York as a minimal tropical storm, impacts are unknown.
- August 2, 1908: A hurricane develops near North Carolina and moves northward along the coast, brushing Long Island.

=== 1916 ===
- July 21, 1916: Strong winds are reported on Long Island as a category 1 hurricane passes to the east.

=== 1933 ===
- August 25, 1933: The 1933 Chesapeake–Potomac hurricane produces up to 6 inches (150 mm) of rain in Southeast New York State; other damage is unknown.

=== 1934 ===
- September 8, 1934: A weakening minimal hurricane skirts up the US East Coast and makes landfall on Long Island.

=== 1936 ===
- September 20, 1936: Strong waves and storm surge associated with a powerful hurricane floods much of Long Beach Island and causes severe beach erosion along the coast.

=== 1938 ===
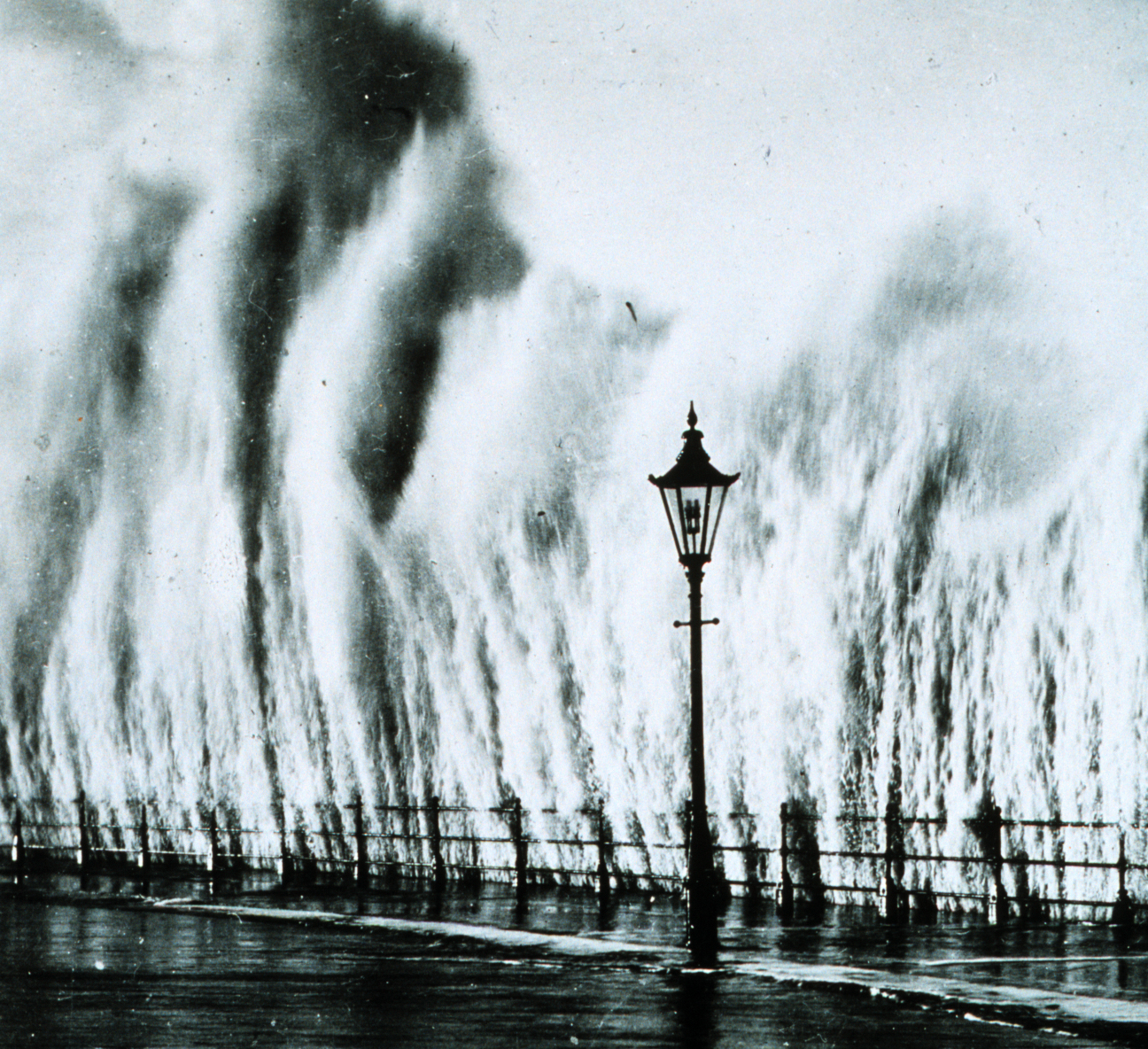
Storm surge from the 1938 New England hurricane

- September 21, 1938: The New England hurricane of 1938 (also called "The Long Island Express") makes landfall on Suffolk County, Long Island as a category 3 hurricane on the Saffir–Simpson hurricane scale. Wind gusts of 125 mph (200 km/h) and storm surge of 18 feet (5 m) washes across part of the island. In New York 60 deaths and hundreds of injuries were attributed to the storm. In addition, 2,600 boats and 8,900 houses are destroyed. Throughout New England the hurricane killed over 682 people, damaged or destroyed over 57,000 homes, and caused property losses estimated at $4.7 billion (2005 US dollars).

=== 1944 ===
- September 14, 1944: The 1944 Great Atlantic hurricane makes landfall on Long Island as a category 1 hurricane on the Saffir–Simpson hurricane scale at a high forward speed of 40 mph (65 km/h). Wind gusts of well over 100 mph (160 km/h) breaks previous wind records in New York City, while a minimum pressure reading of 28.47 inches is recorded on Long Island. 117 homes are completely destroyed, while 2,427 are severely damaged and almost 1000 businesses are destroyed or damaged. In all, six people are killed, and one person is injured.

=== 1945 ===
- September 18, 1945: A weak tropical depression crosses into Southeastern New York.

=== 1949 ===
- August 29, 1949: A tropical storm tracks into Central New York causing no known damage.

== 1950–1974 ==
=== 1950 ===
- August 21, 1950: Hurricane Able parallels the Eastern seaboard dropping 5 in (127 mm) of rainfall in Southern Tier. In NYC and portions of Long Island, rainfall peaked at 3 in (76.2 mm), flooding was reported in portions of New York City.
- September 10–11, 1950: Hurricane Dog produces nearly an inch (20 mm) of rainfall across portions of Long Island as it parallels the Eastern Seaboard.

=== 1952 ===
- September 1, 1952: Hurricane Able generates nearly 6 inches (152 mm) of rainfall in the Southern Tier region of Upstate New York as it crosses the state inland as a tropical storm.

=== 1953 ===
- September 6, 1953: Offshore Hurricane Carol prompted the United States Weather Bureau to issue tropical storm warnings from New Jersey to Maine. In Brooklyn, a fishing boat capsized due to rough waters, though all four men were rescued.

=== 1954 ===
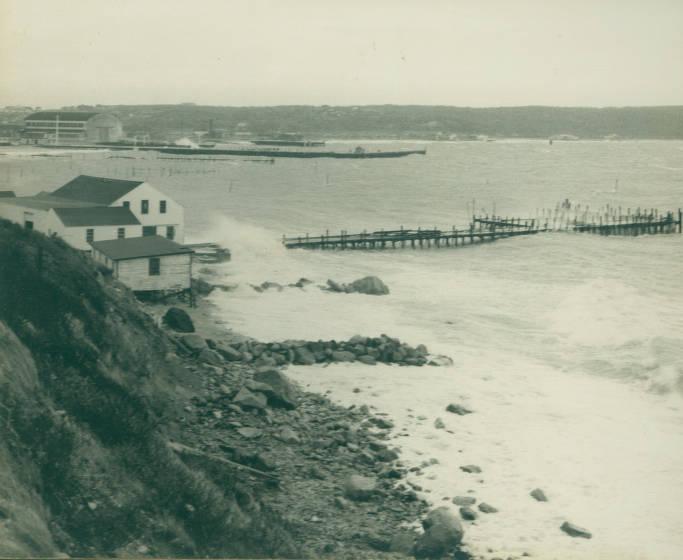
Rough seas in Montauk - Suffolk County from Hurricane Carol.

- August 31, 1954: Hurricane Carol makes landfall on Long Island and produces wind gusts of 120 miles per hour (190 km/h) on Montauk Point. On eastern Long Island near where Carol made landfall, a pressure of 960 mbar is recorded. Winds on the island gust to 120 mph (195 km/h). The hurricane's storm surge covers the Montauk Highway in Montauk, effectively isolating eastern Long Island for a period of time. Due to the compact nature of the storm, most of Long Island is largely unaffected by the hurricane. Specific damage totals for New York are unknown, although the storm in its entirety causes $460 million (1954 USD) in damage.
- September 10, 1954: Hurricane Edna tracks to the east of Long Island producing 9 inches (230 mm) of rain. Prior to the storm, New York City orders an emergency standby for the majority of its hospitals, and subways.
- October 15, 1954: The remnants of Hurricane Hazel quickly accelerated to the Northwest while crossing into Upstate New York. Though not near the center, a wind gust of 113 mph (182 km/h) was recorded in Battery Park, the highest wind gust ever recorded in New York City. In Upstate New York, flooding blocked highways and railroads, The 491-foot (150 m) tower of television station WTVE in Elmira was toppled by wind gusts; the station was off the air for 19 months.

=== 1955 ===
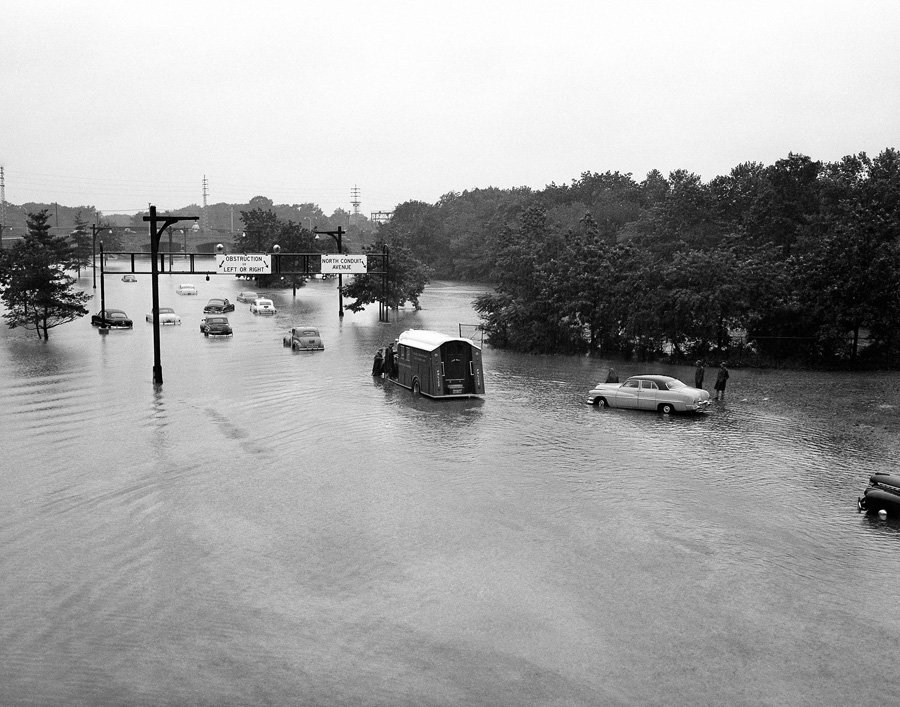
Flooding in New York caused by Connie as it passes to the southwest of the state.

- August 13, 1955: Hurricane Connie produces 13.24 inches (370 mm) of rain in Southeast New York, although damage is unknown.
- August 19, 1955: Hurricane Diane causes flooding in mountainous regions in Southeastern New York. Damage in the state was largely limited to an area between Port Jervis and Poughkeepsie, where totals reached $16.2 million with one reported fatality.

=== 1956 ===
- September 28, 1956: The remnants of Hurricane Flossy stays to the south of Long Island, brushing it with light rainfall.

=== 1957 ===
- June 29, 1957: The remnants of Hurricane Audrey produces moderate amounts of rainfall and strong winds across Upstate New York. Rainfall peaked at 3 in (76.2 mm), Jamestown, New York recorded peak wind gusts of 100 mph (160 km/h), while areas of New York near Lake Ontario experienced intense wind gusts that caused widespread power outages. The winds raised the water level in the lake 3 ft (90 cm) above normal, damaging small boats. The rise in Lake Ontario also damaged sightseeing facilities and river docks downstream of the Niagara Falls; total damage in New York was estimated at between $250,000–$400,000 (1957 USD), and four deaths were reported in the state.

=== 1959 ===
- July 10–11, 1959: Offshore Hurricane Cindy produces moderate rainfall on Long Island, peaking at 5 inches (127 mm) near Wading River, Long Island.
- October 1, 1959: The remnants of Hurricane Gracie track into Central New York and drops up to 6 inches (150 mm) of rain.

=== 1960 ===
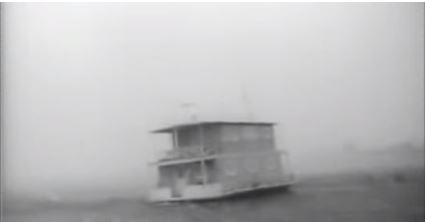
Storm surge from Hurricane Donna showing a house being swept away in Long Island.

- September 11, 1960: Hurricane Donna makes landfall on Long Island as a Category 2 hurricane. Sustained winds of 100 mph (160 km/h) on eastern Long Island and 70 mph (115 km/h) winds on western Long Island are reported, and tides are 6 feet (2 m) above normal along most of the coast. Strong waves also cause beach erosion and several homes along the shore to be destroyed. Due to well-executed warnings, damage are extremely low, and it is reported that no deaths result from the storm.

=== 1961 ===
- September 21, 1961: Hurricane Esther causes $3 million (1961 USD, $20 million 2007 USD) in damage in Suffolk County as it tracks to the east of Long Island. Coastal areas of Long Island were flooded, as well as storm surge and wind gusts of 108 mph (174 km/h), which causes 260,000 homes to be left without power.

=== 1962 ===
- October 8, 1962: Hurricane Daisy tracks east of New England, producing light rainfall in extreme eastern portions of Upstate New York.

=== 1964 ===
- September 23, 1964: Beach erosion and moderate wind gusts are reported on Long Island as Hurricane Gladys tracks a couple hundred miles south of New York.
- October 19, 1964: The remnants of Hurricane Isbell tracks off the East Coast, producing light rainfall off Long Island.

=== 1968 ===
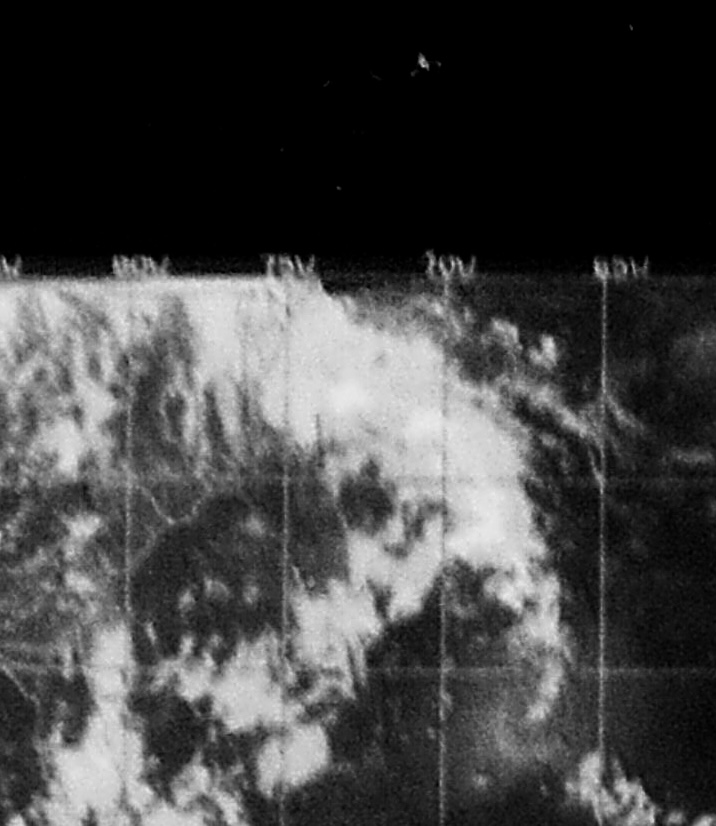
Satellite imagery of the unnamed tropical storm shortly before making landfall on Long Island.

- June 26, 1968: The remnants of Tropical Storm Candy produce rainfall amounting 3.04 in (77 mm) in Buffalo, New York during a 24–hour period. Resulting in streams overflowing their banks, inundating many basements, sewers, and underpasses.
- September 11, 1968: An unnamed tropical storm made landfall on Long Island near peak intensity with winds of 65 mph (100 km/h), tropical storm-force winds were reported across Long Island and Connecticut.

=== 1969 ===
- September 10, 1969: Rainfall up to 3 inches (75 mm) is reported on Long Island and in portions of Southeastern New York associated with Hurricane Gerda.
- October 4, 1969: The remnants of Subtropical Storm One produces light rainfall across New York State dropping only an inch (25 mm) of rain.

=== 1971 ===
- August 19, 1971: The remnants of Tropical Depression Seven makes landfall on Eastern Long Island producing just an inch of rain in the surrounding area.
- August 28, 1971: Tropical Storm Doria produces up to 8 inches (200 mm) of rain in New York City and Upstate New York causing moderate to severe flooding and floods subways in New York City.

=== 1972 ===
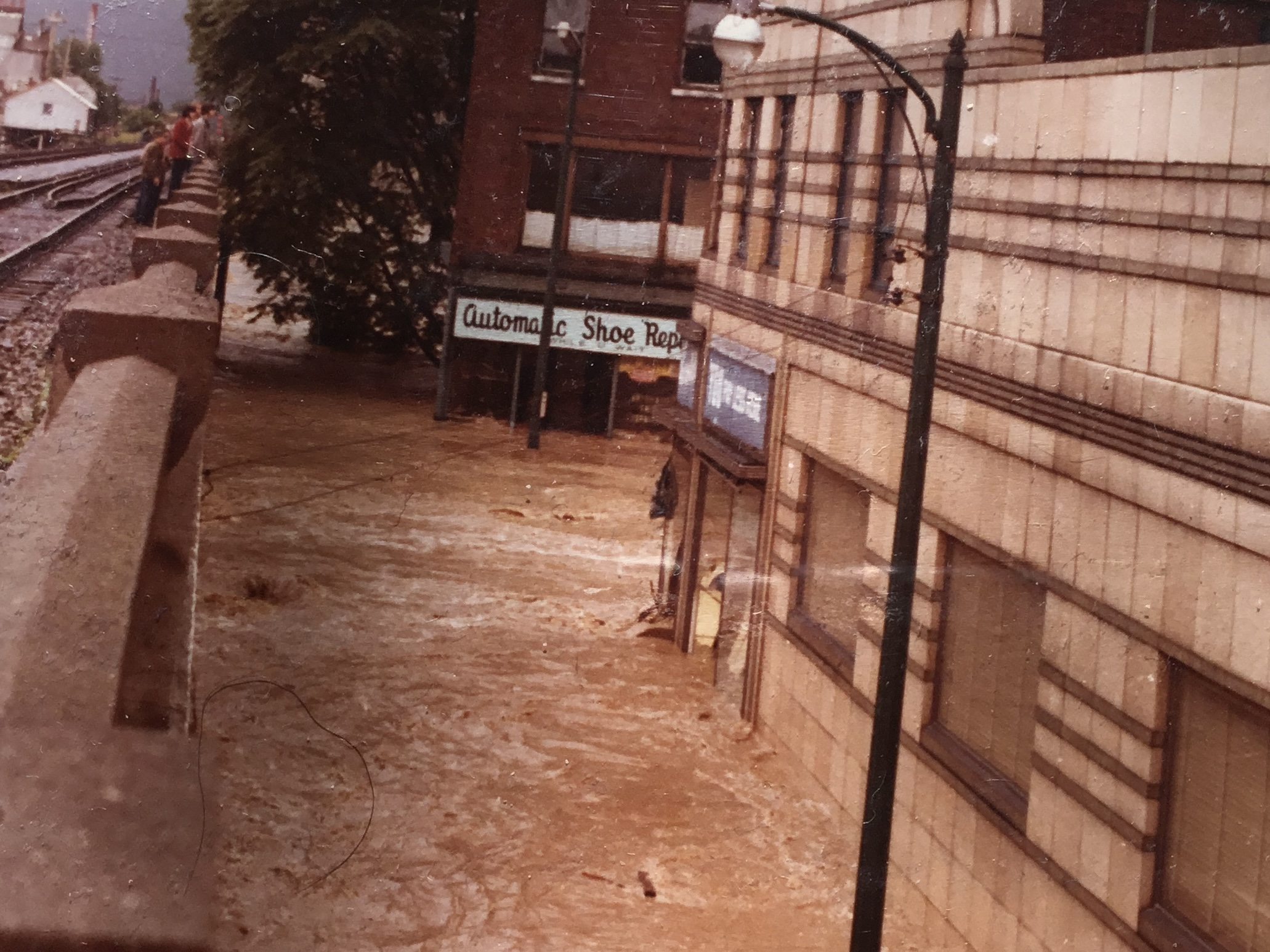
Flooding in Elmira, New York, caused by Tropical Storm Agnes after making landfall in New York City.

- June 22, 1972: The remnants of Hurricane Agnes makes landfall near New York City, producing up to 12 inches (300 mm) of rain in Southeastern New York State and much of Western New York, with locally higher amounts. Storm tides of 3.1 feet (1 m) and wind gusts of 55 miles per hour (89 km/h) occur in New York City, and severe river flooding causes 24 deaths.
- September 3–4, 1972: Tropical Storm Carrie stays east of the state, but produces light rainfall across Eastern Long Island, only dropping an inch (25 mm) of rain.

=== 1973 ===
- August 1, 1973: Subtropical Storm Alfa passes east of Long Island producing extremely light rainfall peaking at only an inch of rain in the far eastern portions of the state between the New York - Connecticut border.

== 1975–1999 ==
=== 1975 ===
- September 25–27, 1975: The remnants of Hurricane Eloise produced the worst flooding in the Mid-Atlantic and Northeast since Agnes in 1972. Heavy rainfall fell in Southern Tier, around 7 to 10 inches (180 to 250 mm) or more of precipitation fell throughout numerous states in the Northeast. In Central Southern Tier, the storm damaged or destroyed over 700 structures. One man died in White Plains, New York from raging floodwaters across the Hutchinson River Parkway.
- October 20, 1975: The remnants of a tropical depression caused flooding across portions of eastern New York, dropping 3 inches (76.2 mm) of rainfall in those areas.

=== 1976 ===
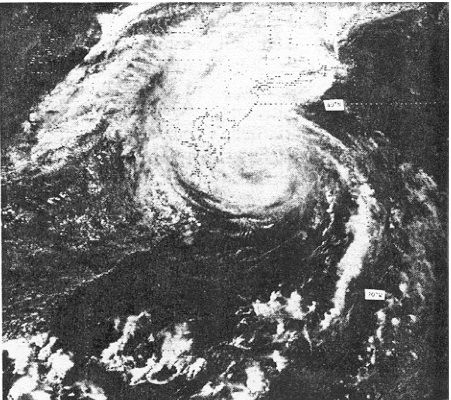
Hurricane Belle approaching Long Island just before landfall on August 9.

- August 11, 1976: Hurricane Belle makes landfall on Long Island as a Category 1 hurricane on the Saffir–Simpson hurricane scale, producing up to 6 inches (150 mm) of rain. 30,000 people are evacuated in New York in anticipation of Belle. Wind gusts of up to 70 mph and tides of 7.2 feet (2.3 m) above normal are reported in New York City and Long Island. Moderate river flooding occurs, as well as minor crop damage. In all, one person is killed by a falling tree, and damage is reported at $257 million (1976 USD).

=== 1978 ===
- September 1, 1978: The remnants of Tropical Storm Debra produces light rainfall along the southern edge of New York State.

=== 1979 ===
- June 18, 1979, The remnants of Tropical Depression One drops just an inch (25.4 mm) of rainfall over New York City as it crosses through the East Coast.
- September 7, 1979: The remnants of Hurricane David produce light to moderate rainfall up to 3 inches (75 mm) in much of New York State.
- September 15, 1979: The remnants of Hurricane Frederic trek through Upstate New York, dropping 5 inches (127 mm) of rainfall over portions of the Niagara Frontier and North Country. However, no documented damage is known.

=== 1981 ===
- November 16–17, 1981: An unnamed subtropical storm brought significant beach erosion and coastal flooding along the New York coastline.

=== 1983 ===
- October 2, 1983: The remnants of Tropical Storm Dean produces light rain near New York City, and causes minor beach erosion.

=== 1984 ===
- October 15, 1984: Offshore Hurricane Josephine produces minor coastal flooding along the shores of Long Island and New Jersey, tides pushed 2–4 ft (0.61–1.22 m) above the normal level.
- October 29, 1984: The remnants of an unmarked tropical depression, later being designated as the Seventeenth tropical cyclone of the season in post-analysis trekked just north of New York City, producing extremely light showers.

=== 1985 ===
Hurricane Gloria prior to making landfall in Long Island on the 27.

- July 27, 1985: The remnants of Hurricane Bob produce light rainfall in Southeastern New York.
- September 25, 1985: Tropical Storm Henri makes landfall in Eastern Long Island with sustained winds of 40 mph (65 km/h), producing light rain in isolated areas.
- September 27, 1985: Hurricane Gloria makes landfall on Long Island as a Category 2 hurricane. Wind gusts of up to 100 mph (160 km/h) and 3.4 inches (86 mm) of rain, contribute to $300 million (1985 USD, $591 million 2007 USD) in damage, and one fatality. In addition, 48 homes on Long Island were destroyed, and hundreds more were damaged.

=== 1987 ===
- September 10, 1987: Tropical Depression Nine crosses into Southern Upstate New York, producing up to 3 inches (75 mm) of rain in much of New York State.

=== 1988 ===
- August 30, 1988: The remnants of Tropical Storm Chris produces moderate rainfall in Upstate New York. Around 3 people died in association to Chris due to drowning and tree-falling incidents in Mamaroneck and Highland Falls respectively.

=== 1989 ===
- September 8–9, 1989: Hurricane Gabrielle produces rough surf and dangerous rip currents off the East Coast. Four people in total were killed in New York from drowning.
- September 24, 1989: The remnants of Hurricane Hugo produces maximum rainfall of 3 in (76.2 mm) and gusty winds in Central and Eastern New York. One person was killed in Norwich, New York, after a falling tree struck the car he was in.

=== 1990 ===
- October 12–14, 1990: The remnants of Tropical Storm Marco and associated moisture from offshore Hurricane Lili triggers flooding that closed a portion of a railway line and a highway in New York.

=== 1991 ===
Hurricane Bob near peak intensity as a Category 3 hurricane southeast of New York in the morning of August 19.

- August 19, 1991: Hurricane Bob comes within a short distance of making landfall on the eastern tip of Long Island as a category 2 hurricane. Heavy rainfall up to 7 inches (175 mm) and high wind gusts causes two deaths and $75 million (1991 USD, $117 million 2007 USD), as well as severe beach erosion which came as a result of storm surge up to 6 feet (2 m) above average.
- October 30, 1991: The 1991 Perfect Storm is considered to have caused the most coastal damage in New Jersey and New York since the 1944 Great Atlantic Hurricane. The system killed three people in total in New York. A man was swept off a bridge due to high winds, as well as two people that were killed off Staten Island where numerous boats were damaged or destroyed. High waves also flooded the beach at Coney Island. While still dubbed the “Halloween Gale/Storm of 1991” as a Nor’easter and just before absorbing Hurricane Grace, for days the storm lashed the US Northeastern coast with high waves, causing significant coastal flooding from North Carolina to Maine where the flooding damaged or destroyed hundreds of homes and businesses and closed roads and airports.

=== 1992 ===
- August 28, 1992: The remnants of Hurricane Andrew produce light rainfall in the western portions of the state.
- September 27, 1992: Tropical Storm Danielle produces light rain in Western New York.

=== 1993 ===
- September 2, 1993: Offshore Hurricane Emily produces high tides and rough seas that cause coastal flooding along Fire Island, New York.

=== 1994 ===
- July 22, 1994: The remnants of Tropical Depression Two produces light rain in isolated areas of the state and generates thunderstorms which down several trees.
- August 18, 1994: The remnants of Tropical Storm Beryl produce up to 3 inches (75 mm) of rain in Central New York causing moderate flooding which causes two fatalities and $1.5 million (1994 USD) in damage, and 14 homes are damaged or destroyed. In addition, State Route 7 was closed for several hours due to flooding.

=== 1995 ===
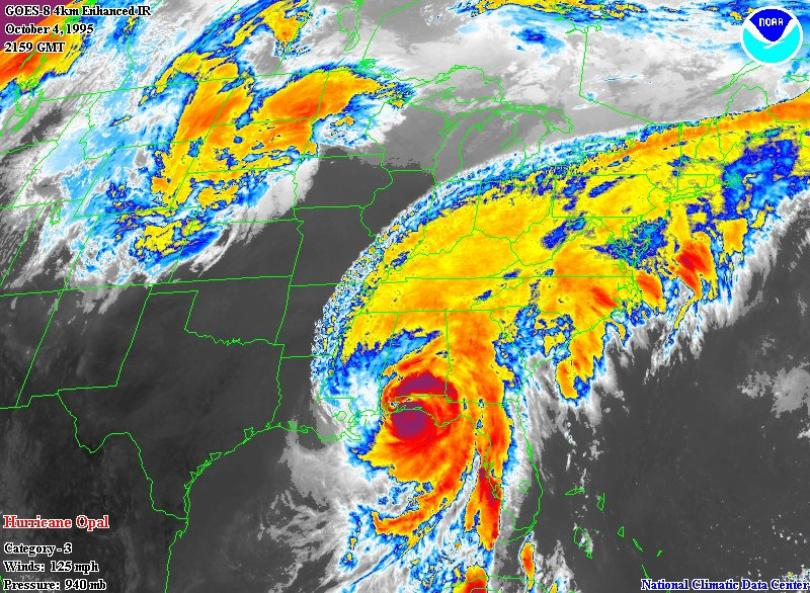
Infrared satellite imagery of Hurricane Opal on October 4. Opal's interaction with the jet stream pushes moisture and outflow far into the Northeastern United States.

- August 17–18, 1995: Rough seas from Hurricane Felix causes two houses to collapse along the shores of Fire Island, New York.
- September 9–10, 1995: While offshore the East Coast of the United States, rough seas from Hurricane Luis caused the death of one person who swam in high waves and destroyed one home in New York.
- October 5–6, 1995: The remnants of Hurricane Opal would cross into Upstate New York just west of Buffalo. Dropping 2 to 3 inches (38–64 mm) of rain over the area. Total damage stacked to $35,000 mostly due to automobile damage from a large downed tree limb in Saratoga Springs.

=== 1996 ===
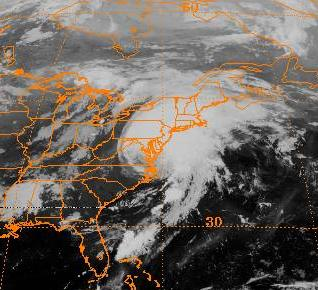
Tropical Storm Bertha shortly before making landfall on Long Island.

- July 13, 1996: Hurricane Bertha makes landfall on Long Island as a tropical storm, producing heavy rainfall which caused moderate flooding in the lower Hudson Valley in addition to tropical storm-force winds.
- September 7, 1996: Offshore Hurricane Edouard causes minor beach erosion, minimal amounts of rainfall, about less than half an inch at peak, and coastal flooding on eastern Long Island, winds remained below tropical storm-force.
- September 8, 1996: The remnants of Hurricane Fran steers west of western New York, dropping little rainfall statewide. Rainfall peaked at 3 in (76.2 mm) in Chautauqua County.

=== 1997 ===
- July 24, 1997: Hurricane Danny reforms off the East Coast into a tropical storm, dropping light rainfall over New York City and Long Island as it stalls off the coast of Nantucket.

=== 1998 ===
- August 28–29: Hurricane Bonnie produces little rainfall onto New York State as it steers off the Eastern seaboard as a tropical storm, 0.2 in (5.1 mm) of total rainfall was reported.

=== 1999 ===
Hurricane Floyd producing moisture far into the Northeastern U.S. prior to making landfall in New York.

- September 8, 1999: The remnants of Hurricane Dennis produce bands of heavy rain which caused some flooding, especially in Rockland County where three feet of flood water accumulated in some locations.
- September 16, 1999: Hurricane Floyd makes landfall on Long Island as a tropical storm producing rainfall amounts of up to 13 inches (325 mm) and wind gusts of up to 60 mph (95 km/h) affect Southeastern New York. Severe flooding results from the storm, killing two people and causing an early estimate of $14.6 million (1999 USD), although it is reported that damage could total to far more than that. One of the deaths occurred when a person was swept into a flooded river.

== 2000–2009 ==
=== 2000 ===
- September 20, 2000: The remnants of Hurricane Gordon produce light rainfall in Southeastern New York State.
- September 30, 2000: Swells produced by offshore Hurricane Isaac capsized a boat of four passengers in Moriches Inlet. One of the passengers died from drowning.

=== 2001 ===
Erin offshore the Eastern seaboard on September 11, the smoke plumes from the destroyed twin towers shortly after the September 11 attacks can be seen emanating from New York City (upper left side).

- June 17, 2001: As it re-emerges and gains subtropical characteristics just south of the state, Tropical Storm Allison produces moderate rainfall up to 3 inches (75 mm), resulting in minor to moderate flash flooding.
- September 11, 2001: Offshore Hurricane Erin generates swells across the New Jersey and New York coastlines, in Rockaway Beach to Long Beach in particular. Erin steered away from the Northeastern United States due to a present cold front in the region, alongside coinciding with the September 11 attacks.

=== 2002 ===
- August 10, 2002: Tropical Storm Cristobal generates rip currents which drown three people on the coast of Long Island.
- September 28, 2002: The remnants of Hurricane Isidore produce widespread light rainfall over much of the state and moderate wind gusts. Some small trees are blown down, and minor power outages are reported.

=== 2003 ===
The outer rainbands of Hurricane Isabel affected the state in 2003.

- September 5–6, 2003: After passing by Bermuda, offshore Hurricane Fabian generates rough surf reaching 8 to 10 ft (2.43 to 3 m) in Jones Beach. Ten people had to be rescued by US Coast Guard off East Hampton, Shinnecock Inlet, and Jones Beach due to rough waters.
- September 17, 2003: The remnants of Tropical Storm Henri produces light to sporadically moderate rainfall across New York State. Rainfall in Platte Cove, New York peaked at 2.57 in (65 mm) while maximum recorded rainfall was near Hancock, New York reaching around 3 in (76.2 mm)
- September 21, 2003: The outer bands of Hurricane Isabel impacts New York State with high winds and considerable flooding. Damage in New York totals to $90 million (2003 USD, $98 million 2006 USD). In and around New York City, about 1.1 million customers were left without power, though most outages were fixed by the day after the hurricane passed through the region. Offshore of Long Beach, rough waves killed a man while bodysurfing.

=== 2004 ===
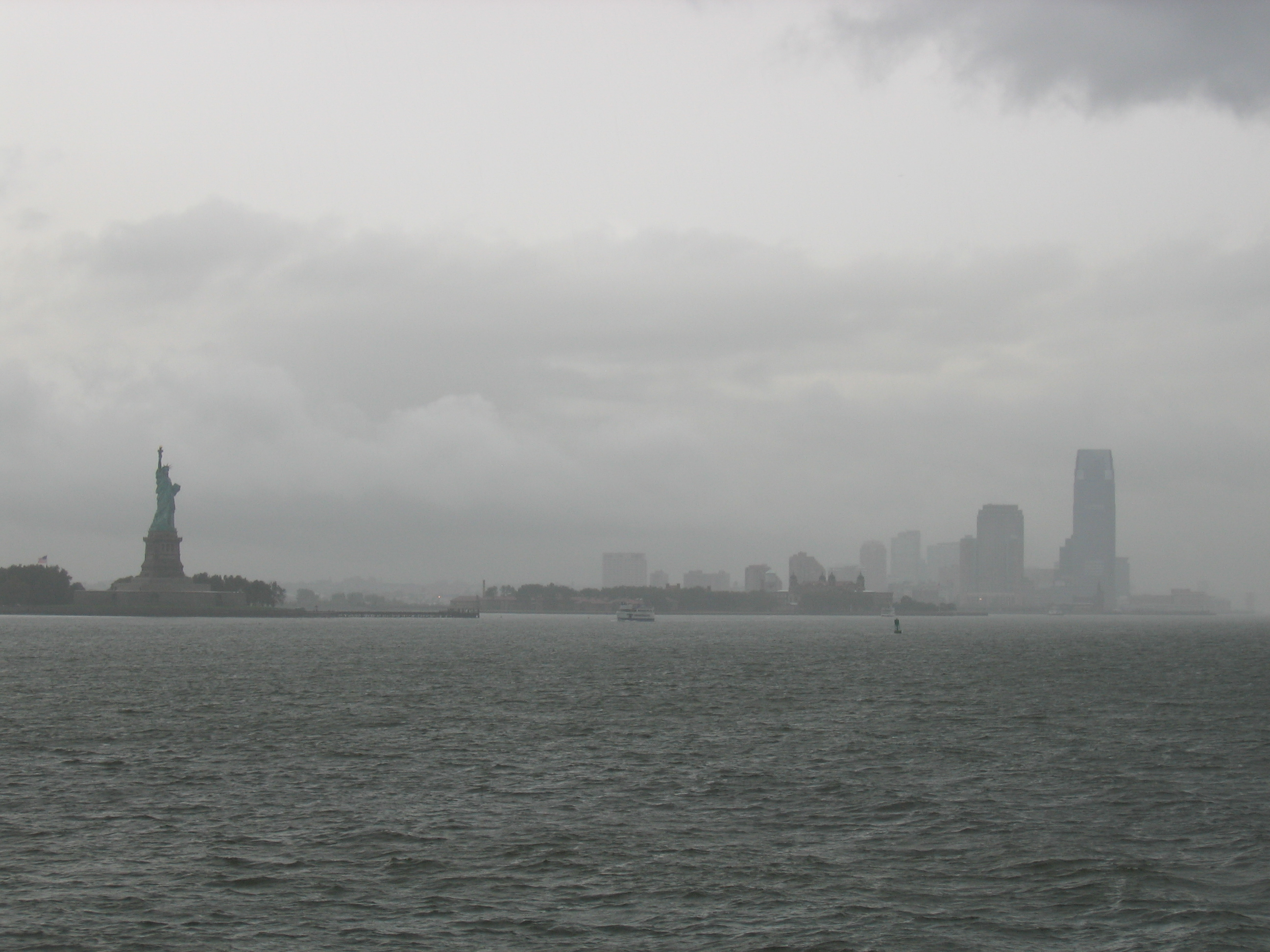
View of the Statue of Liberty and Manhattan under heavy rain and a grey overcasted sky from the remnants of Hurricane Jeanne on September 29.

- August 4, 2004: Hurricane Alex drops 2.83 inches (70 mm) of rain on Long Island.
- August 13, 2004: Tropical Storm Bonnie produces rainfall peaking at 4 inches causing several rivers to swell to at or slightly above flood stage.
- August 14, 2004: The remnants of Hurricane Charley steers near Long Island and produces just an inch of rainfall.
- August 31, 2004: Tropical Storm Hermine stays just east of Long Island, producing little rainfall. Exact rainfall amounts however are hard to be distinguished due to Hurricane Gaston passing near the area just a few days later.
- September 4, 2004: Hurricane Gaston brushes the coast of Southeastern New York and produced light rainfall on Long Island, rainfall totals peak at 3 inches (72 mm) in the Southern Tier region of the state.
- September 9, 2004: The remnants of Hurricane Frances produces heavy rainfall up to 7 inches (175 mm) which causes extensive flooding in central New York. One death from drowning and $6 million (2004 USD) in damage resulting from the flooding.
- September 19, 2004: The remnants of Hurricane Ivan drenched New York City under heavy rainfall and wind gusts reaching 30 mph (50 km/h), flooding subways and leading to network closures just two weeks after Hurricane Frances. Eastern New York recorded 5 in (127 mm) of rainfall, flooding also occurred in Upstate New York, a mobile home park had to be evacuated due to flooding in Ravena, New York.
- September 29, 2004: The remnants of Hurricane Jeanne produces heavy rainfall in the Mid-Atlantic region. In New York City, record daily rainfall amounts were recorded in several locations, including Central Park, and JFK. International Airport which measured 3.6 and 2.67 in (91 and 68 mm) respectively. A few lines after water built up on some of the tracks. Portions of the Henry Hudson Parkway were shut down after 1.5 ft (0.46 m) of water built up on low-lying portions of the roads. Some areas still recovering from floods earlier in the year were hit hardest by the remnants of Jeanne, leaving some basements flooded. Further north, portions of Interstate 87 were shut down due to flooding in Rockland County. Flash flooding in Tarrytown led to additional road closures. In all, Jeanne left $70 million (2004 USD; $117 million 2025 USD) in losses throughout New York.

=== 2005 ===
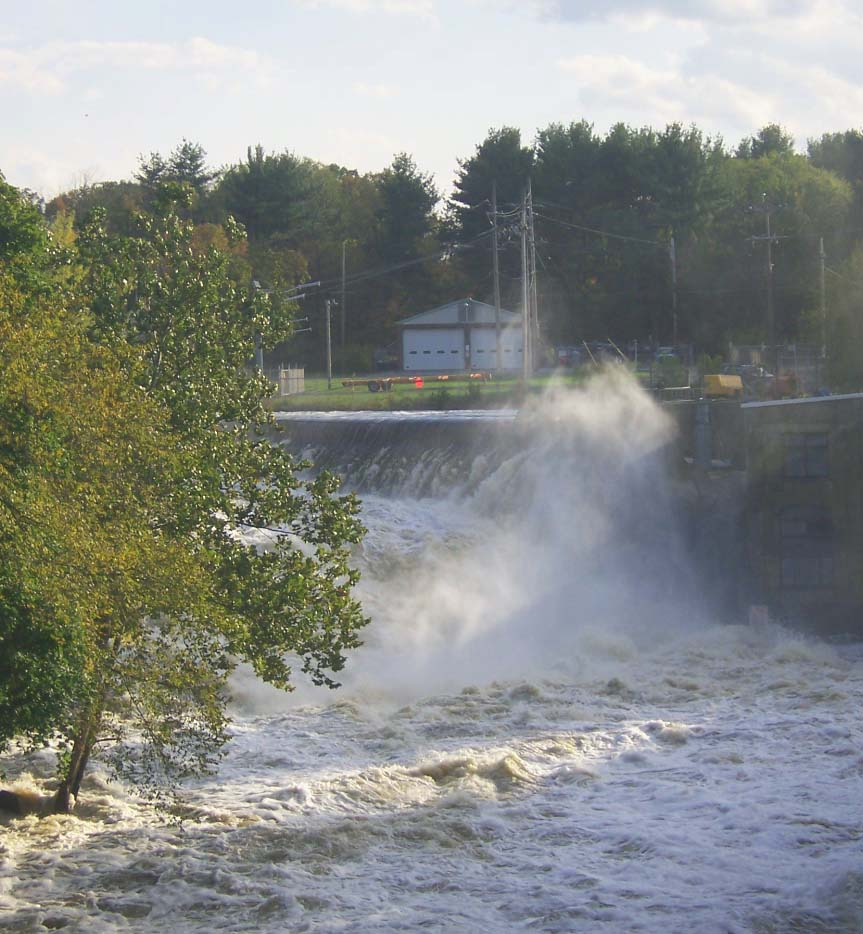
Flooding in Wallkill, New York after the passage of the remnants of Tammy.

- July 9, 2005: The remnants of Hurricane Cindy produce moderate rainfall in Upstate New York causing light damage due to flooding and gusty winds, which downed some trees.
- August 14–15, 2005: Hurricane Irene generates swells reaching 4 to 8 ft (1.2 to 2.4 m) along the New York coastline. A 16-year-old boy drowned after being caught in a rip current near Long Beach, New York.
- August 30, 2005: The remnants of Hurricane Katrina produce heavy rainfall up to 5 inches (125 mm) of rain in the western portion of the state. High winds also affect the state, with 4,500 people in Buffalo left without power after high winds downed trees and power lines.
- September 17, 2005: Offshore Tropical Storm Ophelia drops light rainfall across Long Island, peaking at 1.8 in (46 mm).
- October 8–9, 2005: The remnants of Tropical Storm Tammy are absorbed into an extratropical cyclone attached to a cold front, the system moved up the East Coast of the United States for two days, eventually stalling over the Mid-Atlantic, resulting in becoming the first out of two storms to cause the Northeast U.S. flooding of October 2005. Up to 13 inches (325 mm) of rain caused severe flooding throughout the Hudson Valley, no deaths were reported in the state, and damage is unknown.
- October 14–16, 2005: Just one week after the remnants of Tropical Storm Tammy drenched the region, the remnants of Subtropical Depression Twenty-Two would stall just off Jersey Shore, causing torrential rains and flooding across portions of New England, New Jersey, and New York, resulting in becoming the second out of two storms to cause the Northeast U.S. flooding of October 2005.
- October 25, 2005: The remnants of Hurricane Wilma interacted with a Nor’easter dropping nearly 2 in (50.8 mm) of rainfall across the New York metropolitan area. Areas across New York City, Westchester County, and Long Island reported loss of power, cable, and phone services throughout the day. Swells reached 15–20 ft (4.57–6.09 m) across the New Jersey and New York coastlines, and gusts peaked at 30–40 mph (50–65 km/h).

=== 2006 ===
- July 20–21, 2006: Tropical Storm Beryl produces light rainfall across Long Island, Tropical Storm Watches were issued for New York City and its surrounding areas on July 20 due to the storms close proximity to the city but were discontinued the following day as Beryl recurved towards New England.
- September 2, 2006: The remnants of Hurricane Ernesto produce light to moderate rainfall over much of the state and wind gusts of up to 60 miles per hour (97 km/h). Numerous trees and power lines are reported fallen, and several thousand people are left without power, primarily in the New York City area.

=== 2007 ===
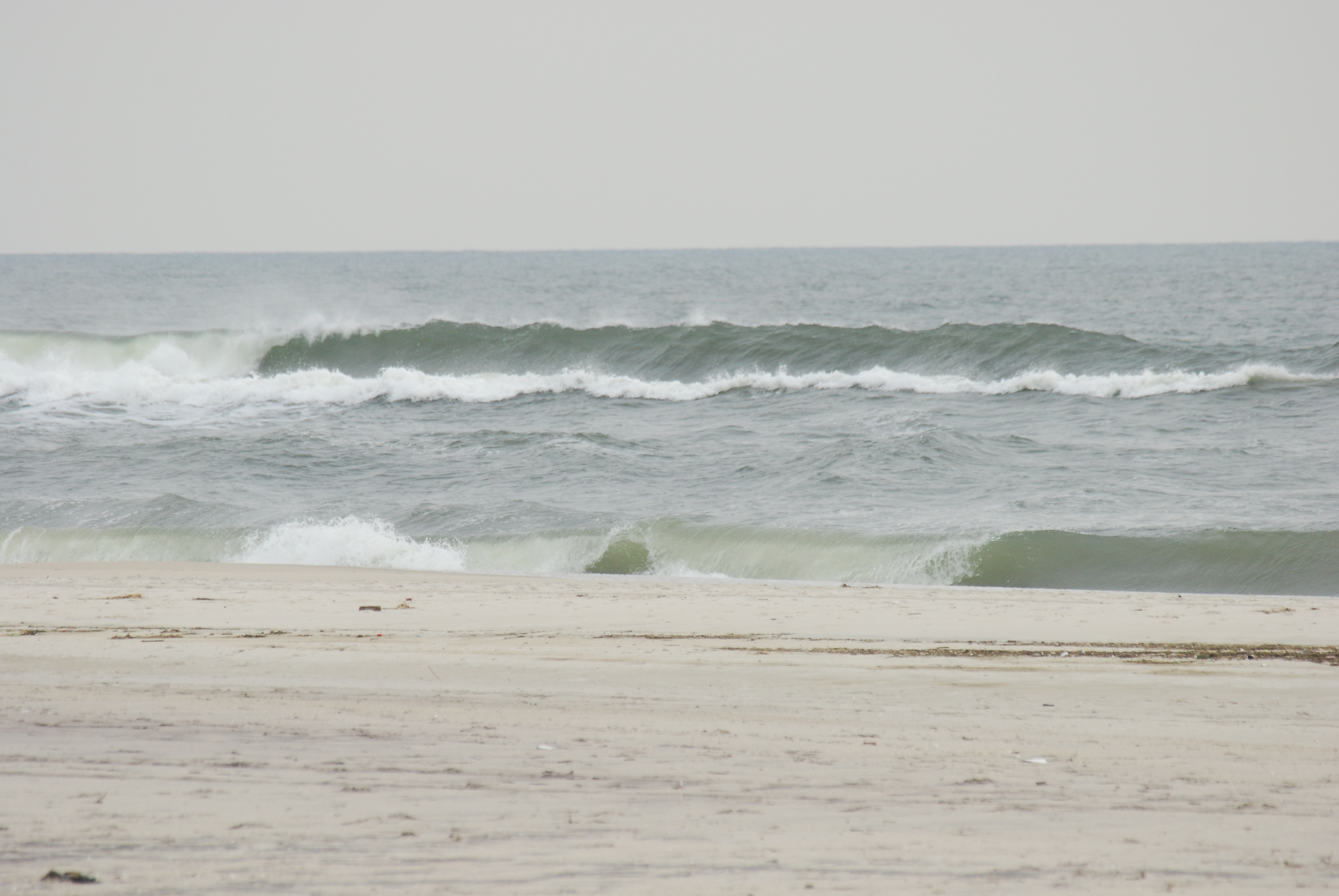
High surf kicked up by the remnants of Hurricane Noel in Jones Beach.

- June 5, 2007: Tropical Storm Barry produces 3.91 inches (99 mm) of rain in New York City. The heavy rainfall leads to flooding in the Finger Lakes region of New York State, washing out roads and driveways. Roads and several driveways were washed out.
- November 4, 2007: The remnants of Hurricane Noel produces strong winds that knocked down trees and power lines, a coastal flood watch and high wind warning was issued for parts of New York, including Long Island. The Long Island Power Authority reported more than 300 power outages across the eastern tip.

=== 2008 ===
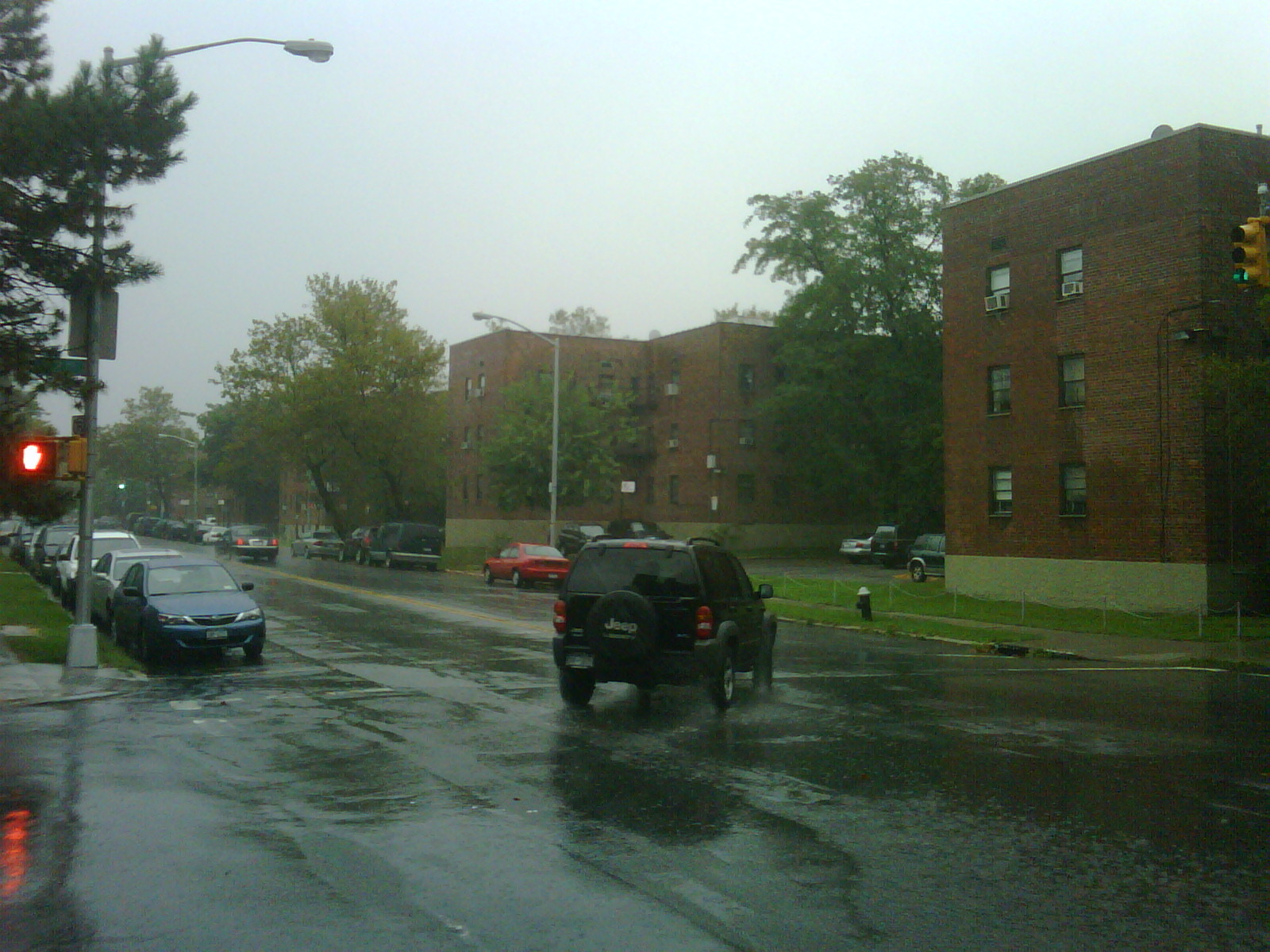
Heavy rainfall from Tropical Storm Hanna in Kew Garden Hills as it makes landfall over Long Island on September 6.

- July 12–14: Offshore Hurricane Bertha generates rip currents across Long Island and the Jersey Shore, killing three people offshore in the latter.
- September 6, 2008: Hurricane Hanna makes landfall on Long Beach as a tropical storm with wind gusts of 52 mph (84 km/h) at Shinnecock Inlet. Aside from numerous downed trees, damage was minimal.
- September 15, 2008: The remnants of Hurricane Ike causes widespread damage across Upstate New York mostly to trees and power lines, most of the damage took place in Rochester, New York where over half of the power outages took place. Across New York State, over 100,000 customers were reported without power.

=== 2009 ===
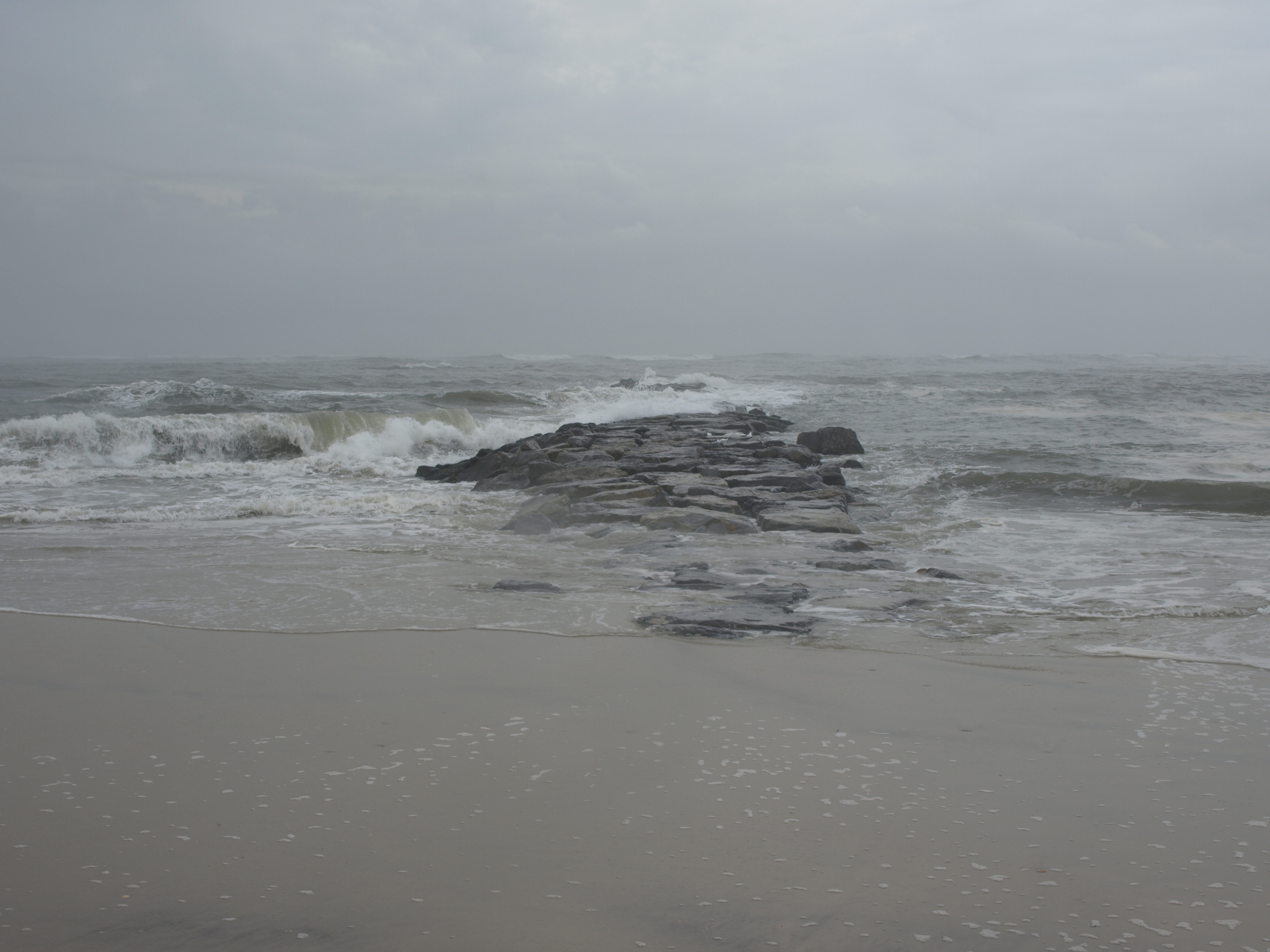
High surf kicked up by Hurricane Bill on Long Island just offshore the Eastern seaboard on August 22.

- August 22, 2009: Offshore Hurricane Bill causes severe beach erosion and coastal damage on the southern shore of Long Island. Beach damage in some areas was worse than Hurricane Gloria in 1985, the significant beach damage in the state amounted to over $35.5 million (2009 USD) in damage.
- November 12–14, 2009: The mid-level remnants of Hurricane Ida would redevelop into a low pressure area, eventually strengthening into a Nor’easter. Dubbed “Nor’Ida” by the US media, the storm resulted in one person drowning in rough seas in Rockaway Beach, beach erosion also occurred there. Total losses amounted to $8.2 million (2009 USD).

== 2010–2019 ==
=== 2010 ===
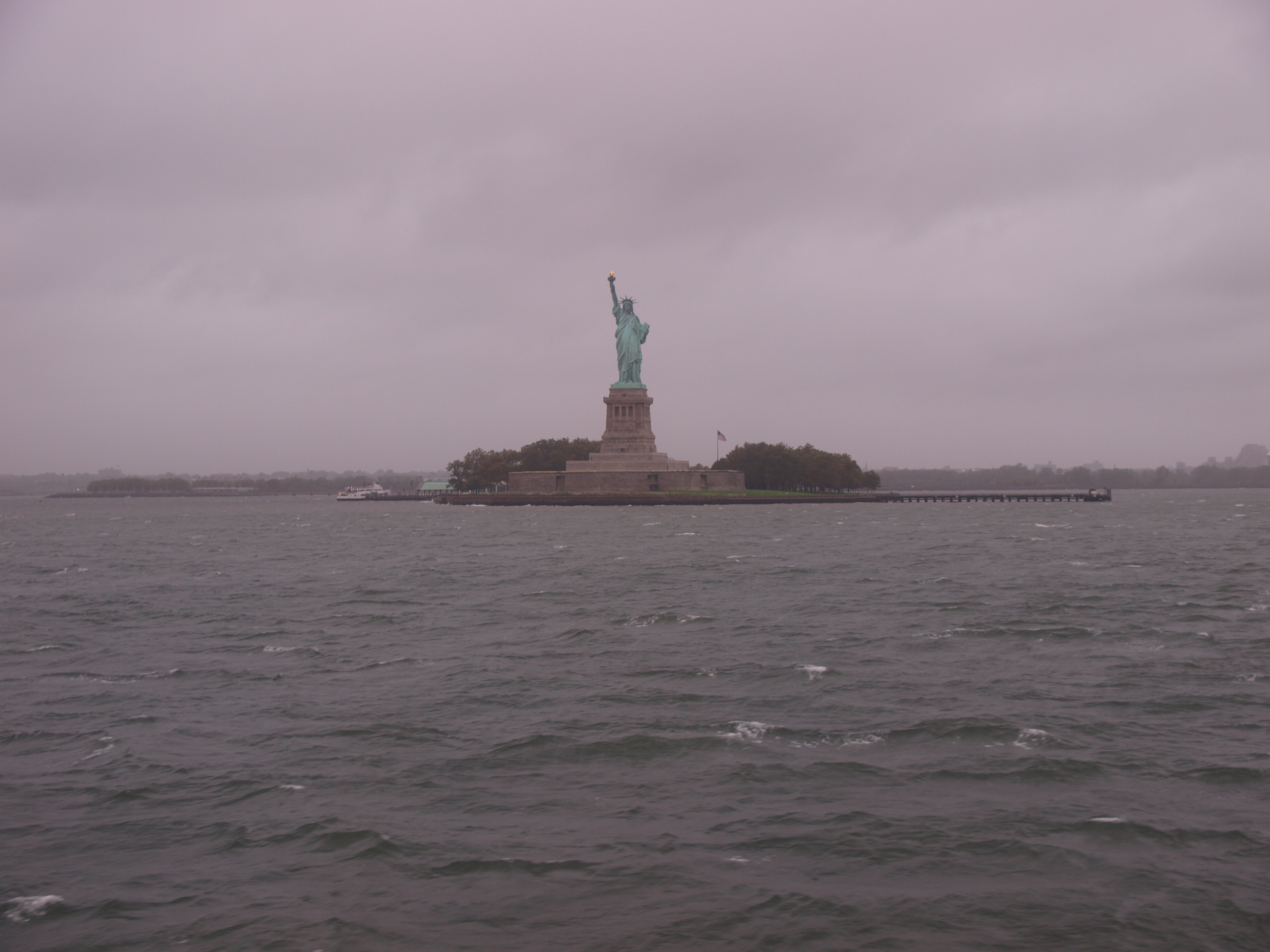
Gloomy overcast above the Statue of Liberty in the wake of the remnants of Tropical Storm Nicole on September 30.

- September 5–6, 2010: Offshore Hurricane Earl produces rough surf off Long Island with the addition of moderate rainfall along The Hamptons. The surf inundated much of Jones Beach State Park leading to officials closing the area for several days. Rainfall associated with Earl's outer bands peaked at 2.11 in (54 mm) just outside Jamesport, Long Island.
- September 20, 2010: The large Hurricane Igor generates significant swells across the Eastern Seaboard, specifically 6 to 10 ft (1.8 to 3.0 m) waves lashed Long Island. Prompting high surf advisories to be issued.
- September 30, 2010: The extratropical remnants of Tropical Storm Nicole would be absorbed into a newly forming Low-pressure area, as the system trekked north it dropped historic rainfall in Binghamton peaking at 4.24 in (108 mm) shattering the 24-hour record for any calendar day. Statewide the storm resulted in $10,000 (2010 USD), and the drowning of one person.

=== 2011 ===
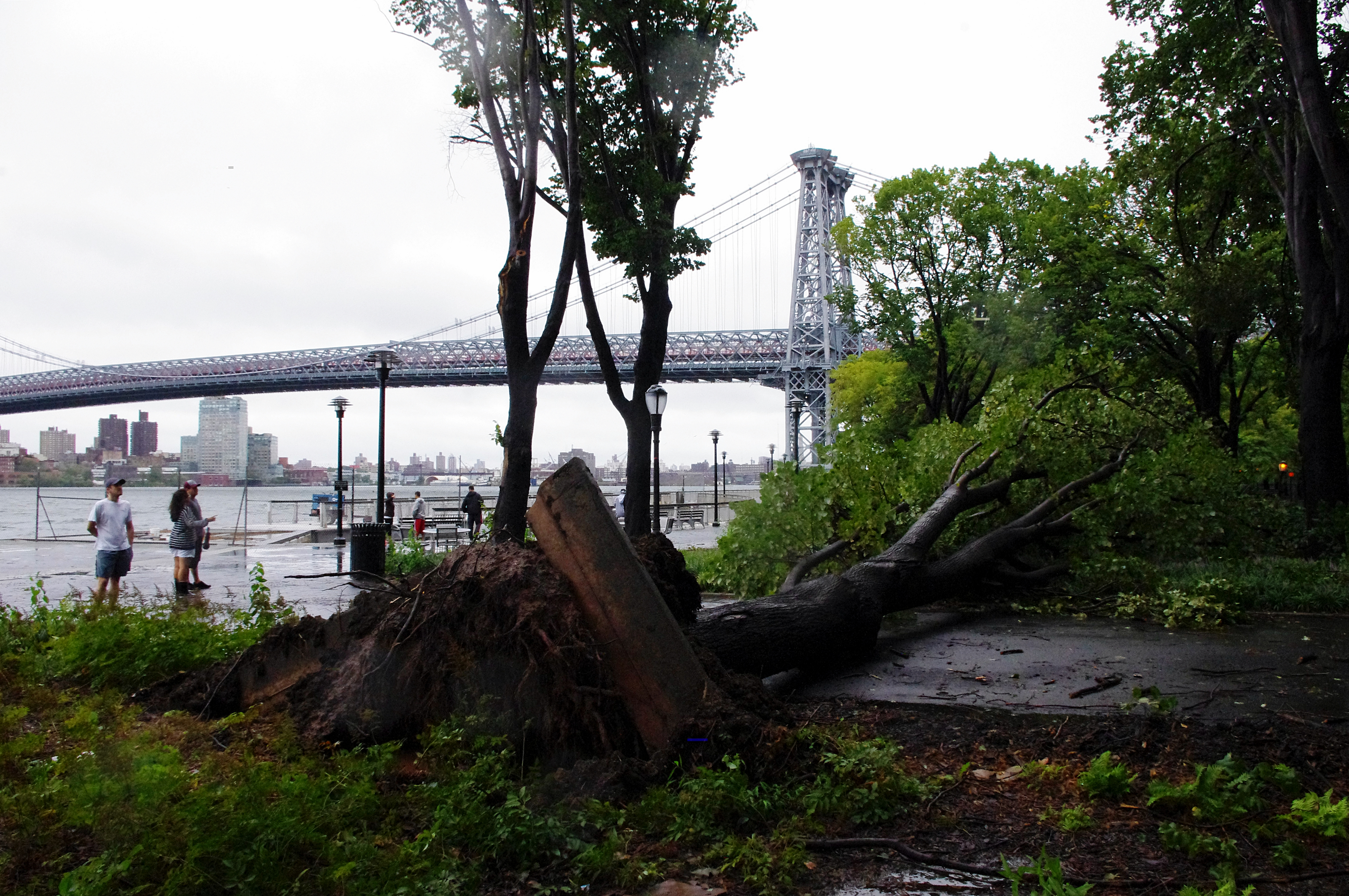
Downed tree near East River Park in East Village, Manhattan caused by Tropical Storm Irene (left). And DOX radar of Irene moving up the East Coast (right).
- August 27–28, 2011: Hurricane Irene makes landfall on Coney Island as a tropical storm with winds of 65 miles (105 km) per hour. Storm surge reached underneath the boardwalks in both Coney Island and Long Beach. and the Hudson River also flooded. Around 210,000 people were without power in Long Island and NYC. Irene killed 5 people statewide and resulting in $296 million (2011 USD) in damage. The storm caused the National Weather Service in Albany, New York to issue a Tropical Storm Warning for the local forecast area. This had never been done before, and actually required a breach in protocol to achieve. Prior to this event, the Albany, New York forecast area was considered outside of the valid area for Tropical Storm warnings.
- September 7–9, 2011: Hurricane Katia generates rough surf and dangerous rip currents in Long Island as it weakens off the East Coast. A rip current risk and high surf advisory were issued for both Nassau and Suffolk Counties.
- September 8, 2011: The remnants of Tropical Storm Lee would cross into western New York causing severe flooding, with the area already saturated from Hurricane Irene, several flood warnings would be issued across numerous counties and major cities including Albany. Two deaths were attributed to Lee in New York.

=== 2012 ===
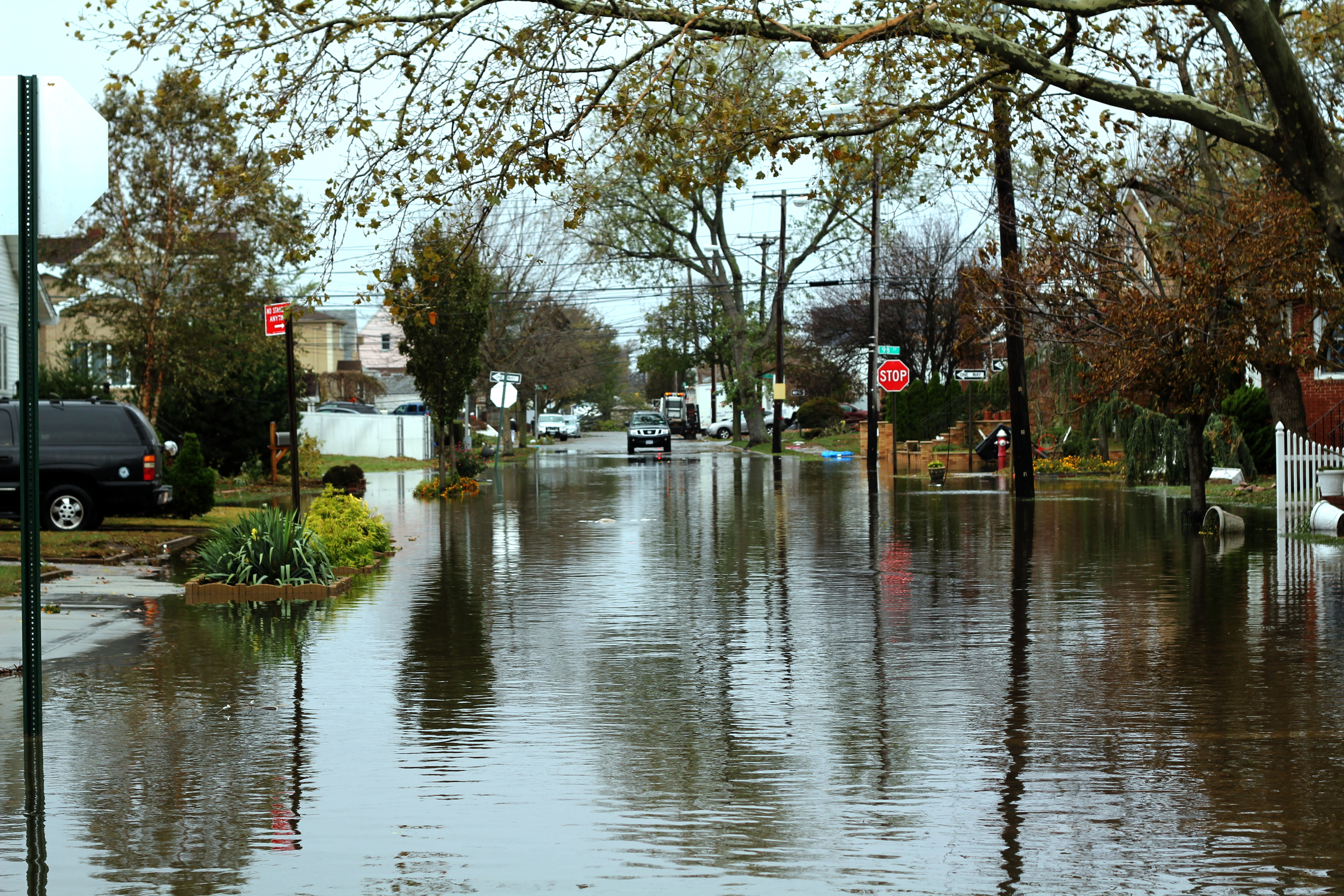
Flooding in Howard Beach, New York caused by the remnants of Hurricane Sandy (left), and a satellite loop of Sandy making landfall in New Jersey shortly after transitioning into a extratropical cyclone (right).
- September 4, 2012: The remnant circulation of Hurricane Isaac would split in two, as one dropped towards the Gulf, the second-smaller piece would move eastwards developing into a new extratropical low over Ohio, dropping small amounts of rainfall peaking at an inch (25.4 mm) or less across the tri-state area and portions of Long Island.
- October 28–29, 2012: Hurricane Sandy, a historic storm, makes landfall near Atlantic City, New Jersey as an extratropical cyclone with sustained winds of 80 mph (130 km/h). Sandy caused $32 billion (2012 USD) in damage whilst resulting in the deaths of 53 people statewide. This storm was unusual because it was a late season hurricane combined with a Nor'easter at high tide during a full moon, producing long-lasting and devastating results not seen in generations. Sandy was not a hurricane when it hit the NY-CT region. Sandy caused a record 14.41 feet (4.39 m) storm surge at Battery Park, New York City, flooding various parts of Lower Manhattan including various tunnels and subway systems, making them inoperable for weeks. As of late 2019 some are still damaged and are in the process of being repaired, with projects like 14th Street Tunnel shutdown. The immediate aftermath included widespread flooding, massive power outages and a system-wide disruption of mass transit service. Sandy had a significant effect on the digital world: the Federal Communications Commission estimated that the hurricane...also disrupted cable TV, broadband Internet and landline phone service for 25 percent of customers in the affected areas." Over nine million customers were without power, including 90 percent of Long Island and most of Manhattan below 49th Street, some for several months. Many low-lying neighborhoods in NJ and NY were completely destroyed. Thousands of homes and businesses were demolished by the record storm surge.

=== 2013 ===
- June 7–8, 2013: The remnants of Tropical Storm Andrea brings impacts towards New York State with 4+ inches of rainfall and wind gusts reaching 45 mph (72 km/h).
- October 12, 2013: As the remnants of Tropical Storm Karen transitioned into a Nor’easter and stalled off the Mid-Atlantic coast. Upstate New York experienced sparse rainfall peaking at 1 in (25.4 mm)

=== 2014 ===
Hurricane Arthur passing south of New York in the middle of July 4.

- July 4, 2014: Hurricane Arthur passes to the south of the New York coastline, producing light to moderate rainfall along the coast; however, winds remain generally below tropical storm force. Some holiday celebrations in the New York metropolitan area were canceled or postponed.
- August 4–5, 2014: Hurricane Bertha stays offshore the Eastern seaboard resulting in rough seas across the Long Island coastline. Two young kids were swept away in eastern Rockaway Beach while bodyboarding but were rescued. The New York City Department of Parks and Recreation temporarily banned bodyboarding because of this incident but the ban was lifted shortly after from criticism by the local surfing community.
- August 28, 2014: Offshore Hurricane Cristobal generates life-threatening rip currents, and significant swells across Brooklyn and Long Island. A high surf advisory was issued from Brooklyn to Montauk, Long Island as the most significant surf was expected to be along central and eastern Long Island.
- September 19, 2014: Offshore Hurricane Edouard generates swells of high waves across The Rockaways in Queens.

=== 2015 ===
- June 21–22, 2015: The remnants of Tropical Storm Bill crosses through Upstate New York, producing just over an inch (25.4 mm) of rain.
- October 1–3, 2015: Offshore Hurricane Joaquin generates high surf, coastal erosion, and minor tidal flooding across Long Island. 2.72 ft (0.83 m) of storm surge and 2.2 ft (0.67 m) of inundation were recorded on October 1 in Kings Point.

=== 2016 ===
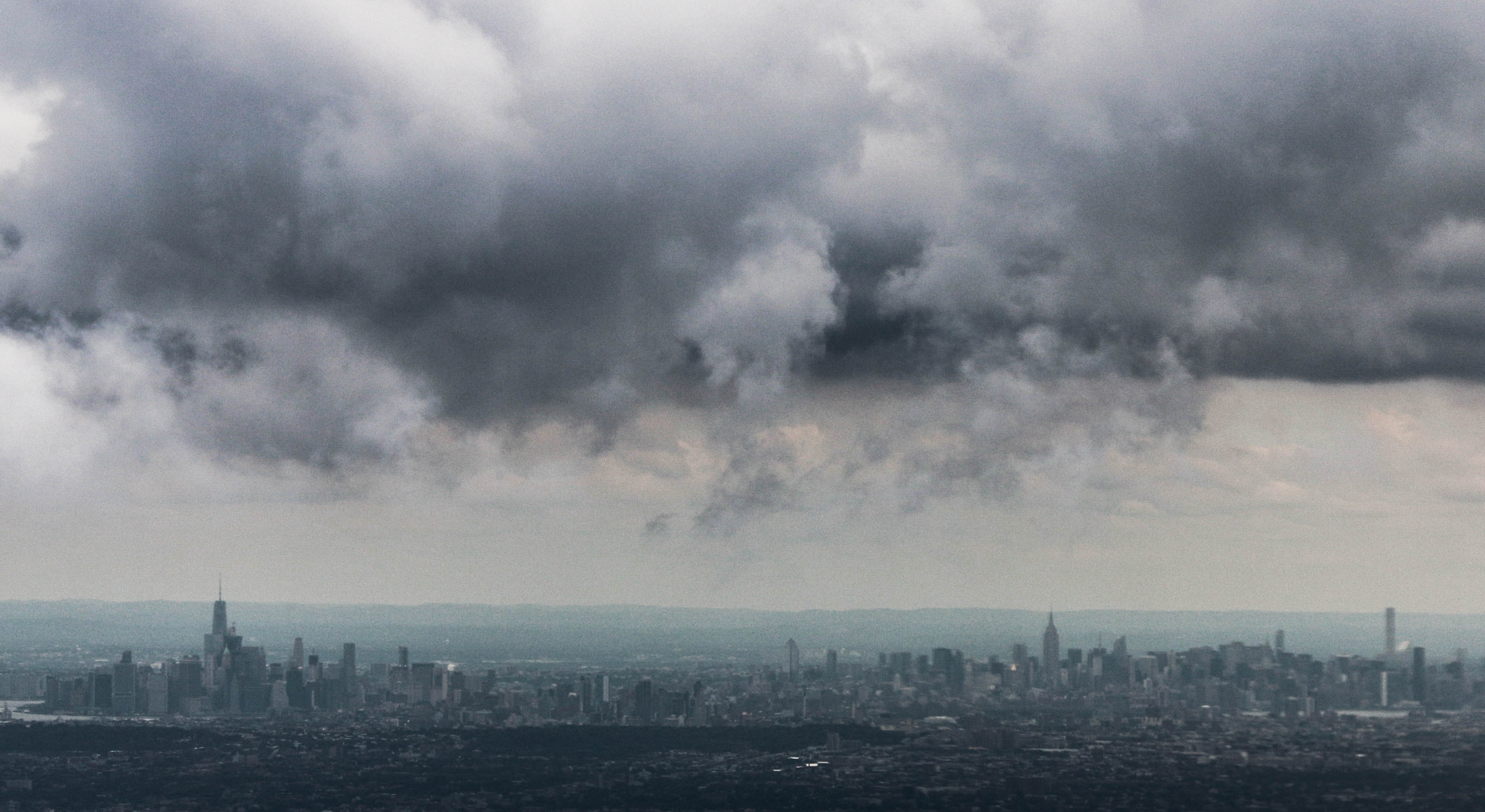
Manhattan under a dense overcast associated with the remnants of Hurricane Hermine on September 3.

- May 31, 2016: Offshore the re-generated Tropical Storm Bonnie brings heavy rain up to the Northeastern United States, New York City recorded 1.65 in (42 mm) of rain.
- September 3, 2016: The remnants of Hurricane Hermine stalls offshore the Eastern Seaboard. A tropical storm warning was issued for New York City in the wake of the storm but was cancelled later on as Hermine transitioned into a post-tropical storm. The storm resulted in the deaths of two fishermen off Wading River in Long Island due to rough surf.
- September 19, 2016: The remnants of Tropical Storm Julia associated with a weak cold front drops 2 to 4 in (50.8 to 101.6 mm) in Eastern New York, the rainfall helped relieve a dry-spell that occurred in the region.
- October 9–10, 2016: The remnants of Hurricane Matthew interacts with a mid-latitude frontal system, enhanced moisture brings heavy rain and minor flooding to the state.

=== 2017 ===
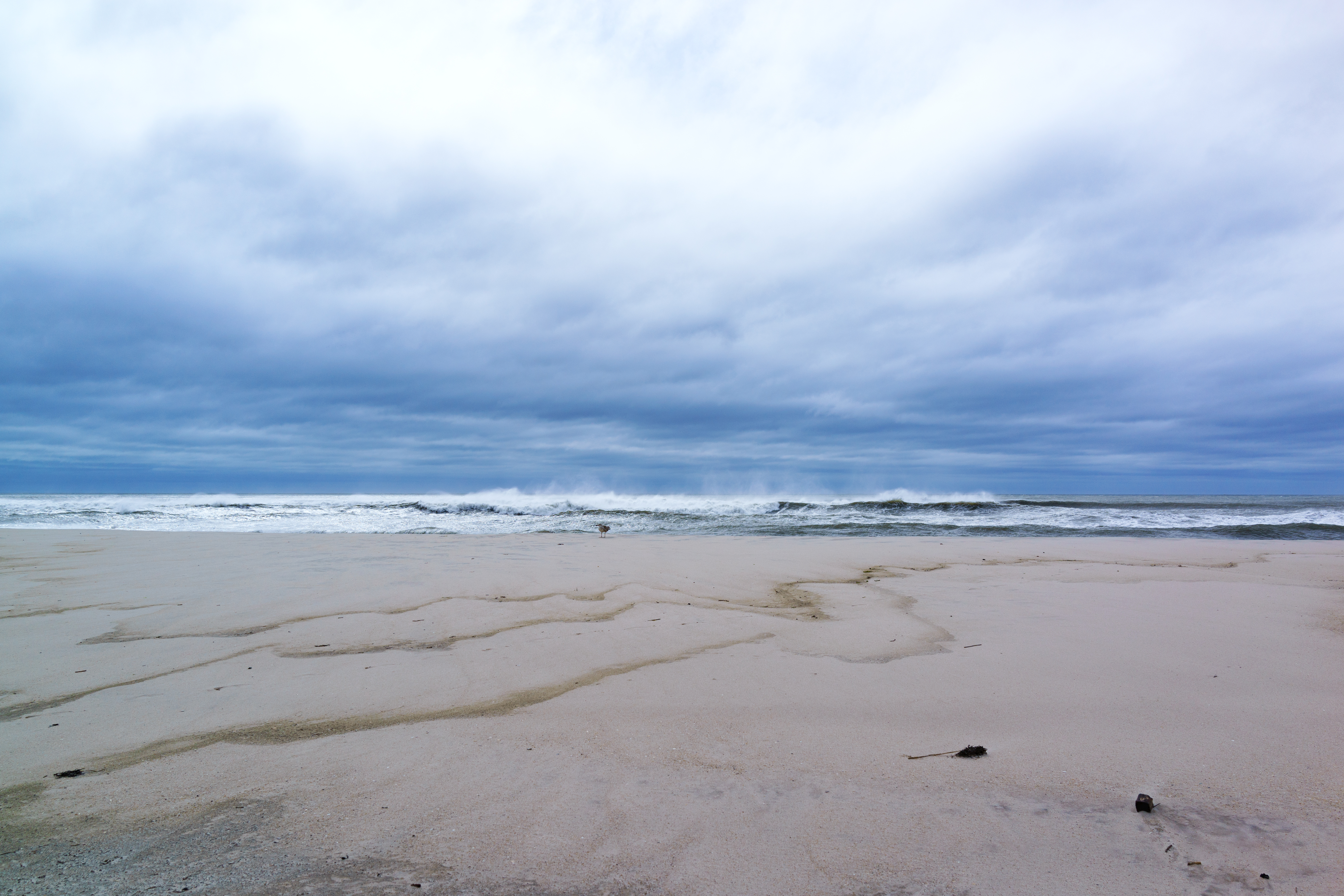
Rough surf generated by offshore Tropical Storm Jose in Cupsogue Beach, New York.

- June 19, 2017: The remnants of Tropical Storm Cindy produced severe thunderstorms and EF-0 tornadoes around the Tri-state area, 2.04 in (52 mm) of rain was recorded in Staten Island.
- August 18, 2017: Offshore Hurricane Gert produces rough surf and high waves across Long Island.
- September 2–3, 2017: The remnants of Hurricane Harvey produces light rainfall across Upstate New York and the New York metropolitan area. Maximum rainfall amounts of 1.72 in (43.69 mm) were recorded in Annadale, Staten Island.
- September 19–20, 2017: Tropical Storm Jose meanders south of Long Island closely, producing heavy wind and rain. Tides pushed around one to two feet across Southern Long Island and NYC.
- September 27, 2017: Offshore Hurricane Maria generates gusty winds, and high surf across Southeastern New York.
- October 28–30, 2017: The remnants of Tropical Storm Philippe merges with a mid-latitude bomb cyclone, dropping 7.00 in (178 mm) of rain in Hunter, New York. Central Park recorded 3.03 in (77 mm) of rainfall. The Long Island Rail Road was temporarily suspended due to the storm.

=== 2018 ===
- September 8–9, 2018: The remnants of Tropical Storm Gordon which had previously been absorbed by another system bring minor flooding to NYC. Rochester in Upstate New York saw 1.19 inches (30 mm) of rainfall.
- September 17–18, 2018: The remnants of Hurricane Florence crosses into Upstate New York as an extratropical cyclone, producing over 4 in (101.6 mm) of rainfall in Upstate New York prompting numerous flood warnings, and closing several roads. Rainfall rates in some areas exceeded 1 in (25 mm) per hour. Total economic losses in New York State amounted to $473,000 (2018 USD) from flash flood damage.
- October 11–12, 2018: Hurricane Michael interacts with a cold front and brings heavy rain and gusty winds to NYC and Long Island. In Islip, 2.29 inches (58 mm) were reported.

=== 2019 ===
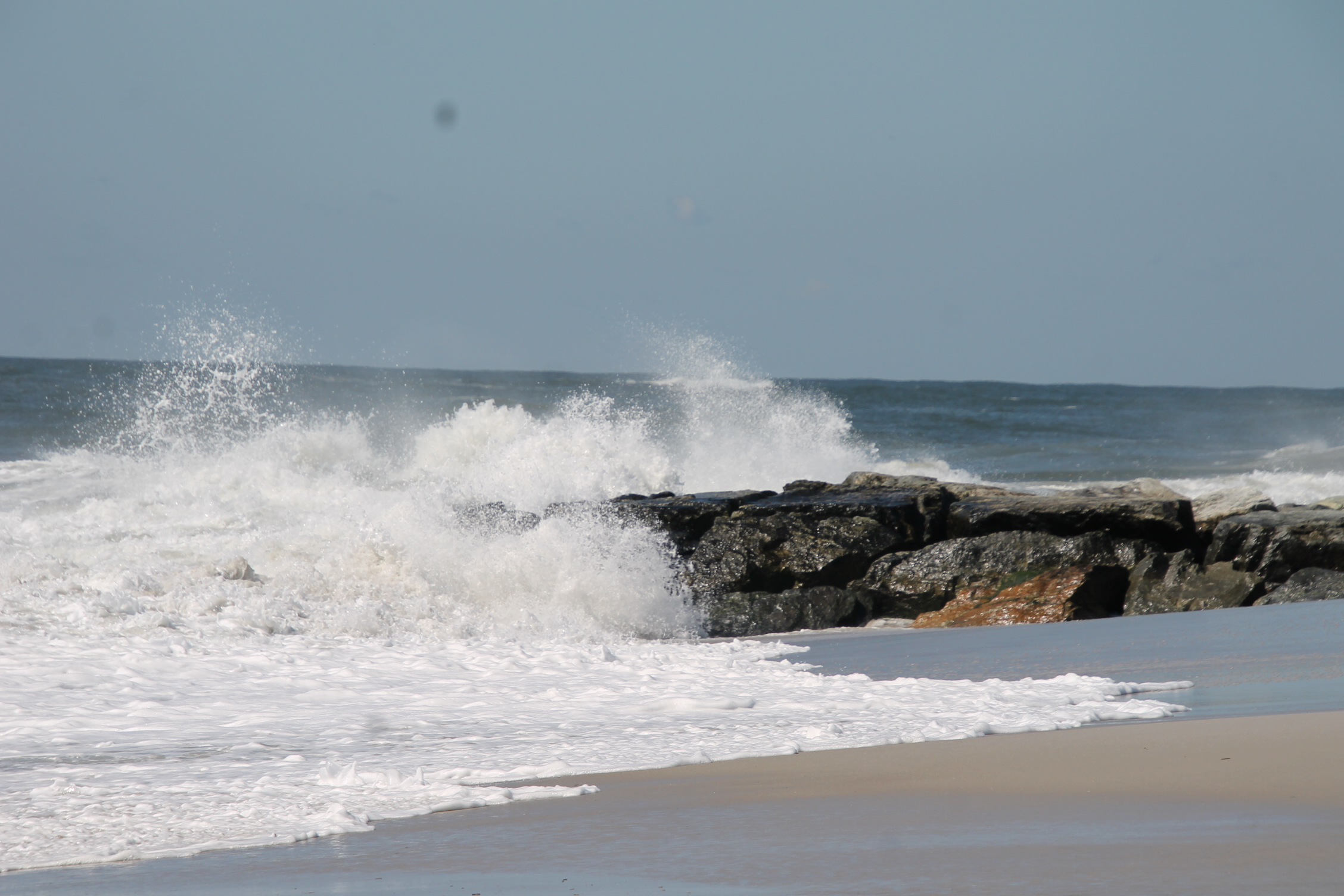
High waves from Hurricane Dorian crashing along the shores of Long Island.

- September 6–7, 2019: Hurricane Dorian prompted rip current warnings and predicted swells of up to 10 feet, which caused the New York City Department of Parks and Recreation to announce that all city beaches would be closed to swimming and surfing, due to the dangerous conditions as an effect from the hurricane.
- October 1–2, 2019: Hurricane Lorenzo generates strong waves and dangerous rip currents, resulting in three people being swept away, one person was rescued however the other two were found dead.
- October 10–12, 2019: Prior to acquiring full tropical characteristics, a Nor’easter that eventually transitioned to Subtropical Storm Melissa generates high waves in Long Island along with gale-force wind gusts.
- October 27, 2019: The remnants of Tropical Storm Olga brings light to moderate rainfall in North Country and Ontario. In Oswego, New York, 1.7 in (43 mm) of rainfall was reported.

== 2020–present ==
=== 2020 ===
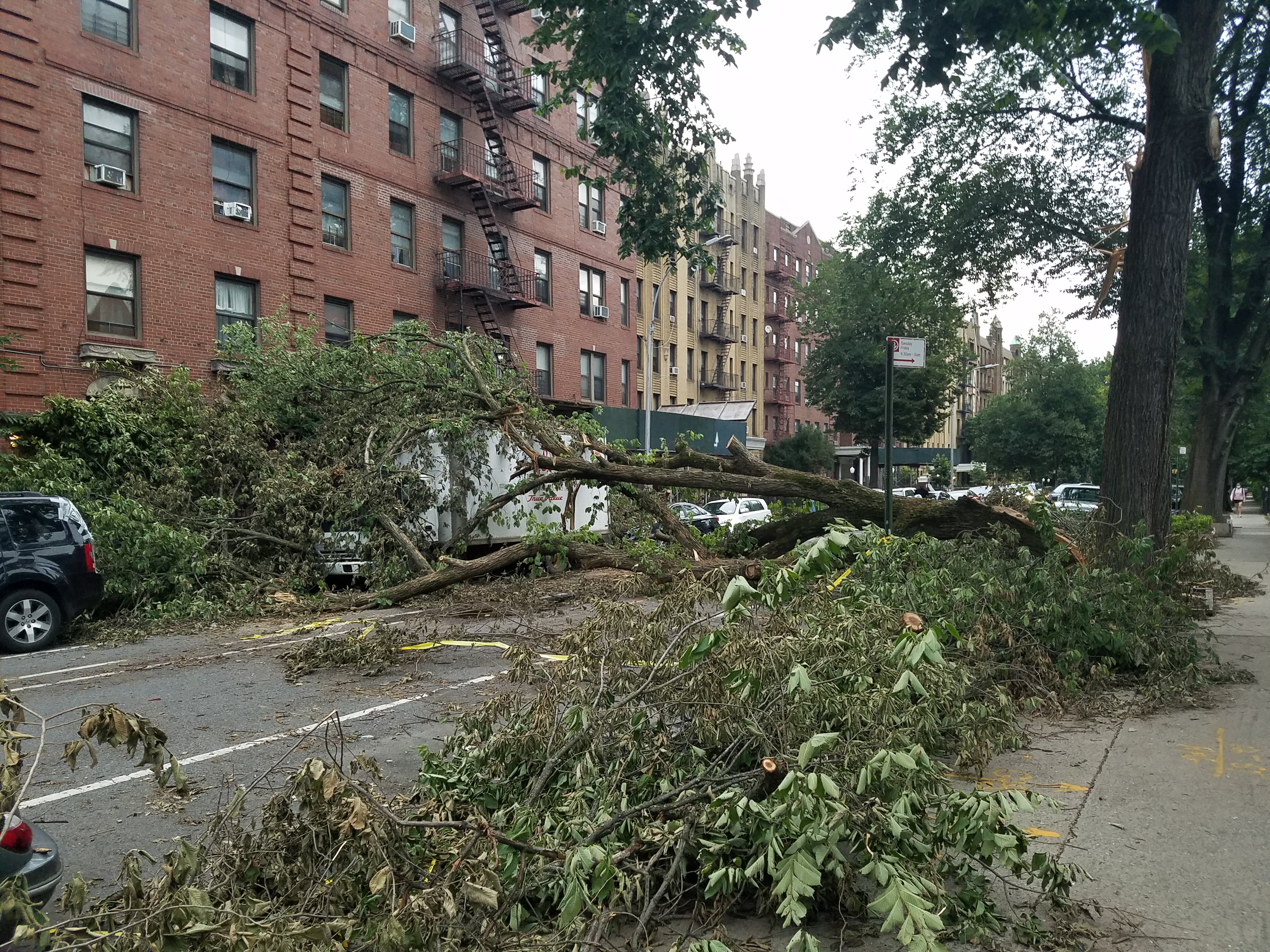
Fallen bough in Crown Heights from high wind gusts days after Hurricane Isaias (left). And a satellite loop of Tropical Storm Fay making landfall in New Jersey and moving into New York State (right).
- May 19, 2020: Offshore Tropical Storm Arthur partially generates excess wind gusts of up to 30 mph (50 km/h) across New York City, bringing cooler-than-average temperatures for the region as the storm drifted away from the Mid-Atlantic coastline while steering south of Long Island.
- May 28–29, 2020: The remnants of Tropical Storm Bertha drops just an inch (25.4 mm) of rainfall in western New York as it drifted northward.
- June 12–13, 2020: The remnants of Tropical Storm Cristobal and its associated moisture help initiate the formation of a derecho that moves eastwards across parts of the Great Lakes region and Ohio Valley, alongside those areas, western New York reported wind gusts of 60 to 80 mph (96.5 to 129 km/h).
- July 10–11, 2020: Tropical Storm Fay made landfall in New Jersey, and then traveled northwestward into New York. In Long Beach, New York, a 19-year-old drowned after being caught in rip currents related to Fay. He was with five other swimmers, who were rescued after also being caught in the rip currents. The storm flooded several New York City Subway stations. An Automated Surface Observation System (ASOS) in Central Park recorded a total of 2.43 inches (62 mm) of rain, while several Mesonet stations in the Boroughs of New York City recorded rainfall totals as high as 2.96 inches (75 mm) in Midtown Manhattan, 2.44 inches (62 mm) in Brooklyn, 2.21 inches (56 mm) on Staten Island, 2.17 inches (55 mm) in The Bronx, and 2.06 inches (52 mm) in Queens.
- August 4, 2020: Hurricane Isaias brought 3 to 6 inches (76.2 – 152.4 mm) of rain with wind gusts of 50 to 80 mph (80 km/h To 130 km/h) in New York State as it crossed into it as a tropical storm. With peak gusts of 78 mph (125.5 km/h) recorded at Republic Airport in Farmingdale and 70 mph (112 km/h) at JFK in Queens. New York City's Flash Flood Emergency plan was activated by New York Emergency Management, due to the minor-moderate risk of storm surge impacting South Street Seaport in Lower Manhattan. On August 3, 2020, a Tropical Storm Warning was issued by the National Weather Service as well as a travel advisory that evening by NY Emergency Management, stating that the strongest of the storm would be from 12 PM to 2 PM (EDT) on August 4. A tornado watch was issued for the area on the morning of August 4. Multiple trees fell damaging several homes, as well as leaving 2.5 million people without power across the tri-state area.
- August 15–16, 2020: Tropical Storm Kyle kicks up rough surf producing strong rip currents across Long Island and the rest of the Eastern Seaboard as it drifts eastwards out to sea. Small craft advisories were in effect for excess wind gusts of 20–30 mph (30–50 km/h) offshore.
- August 31, 2020: The remnants of Hurricane Laura fueled isolated severe thunderstorms, prompting watches and warnings. The risk for severe thunderstorms in New York State were pushed more towards the south in places like New York City and New Jersey with the possibility of heavy rainfall and hail.
- September 14–15, 2020: Hurricane Paulette generates rough surf on Long Island as swells are fueled by North-northeasterly winds associated with the storm.
- September 21–22, 2020: Just a week after Hurricane Paulette brought rough surf conditions along the US East Coast, offshore Hurricane Teddy, a large storm, produces high swells and coastal flooding on Long Island and Staten Island. Marine and surf warnings were issued for the entirety of the New York coastline.
- October 12, 2020: The remnants of Hurricane Delta drops light rainfall across Long Island and New York City. 1 to 2 in (25.4 to 50.8 mm) of widespread rainfall was expected with locally higher amounts reaching over 2 in (50.8 mm). A coastal flood advisory was in effect where 1 foot (0.3 m) of inundation above ground level was likely in vulnerable areas near the waterfront and shoreline.
- October 21–22, 2020: Offshore Hurricane Epsilon generates long-period swells reaching 5–8 feet (1.5–2.4 m) affecting the coasts of New Jersey, New York City, and Long Island.
- October 28–30, 2020: Outer rainbands of extratropical Hurricane Zeta causes rain and snow in portions of New York. In addition, the low temperature in Albany of 19 °F (−7 °C) on Halloween caused after the storm was just one degree from tying the record low.

=== 2021 ===
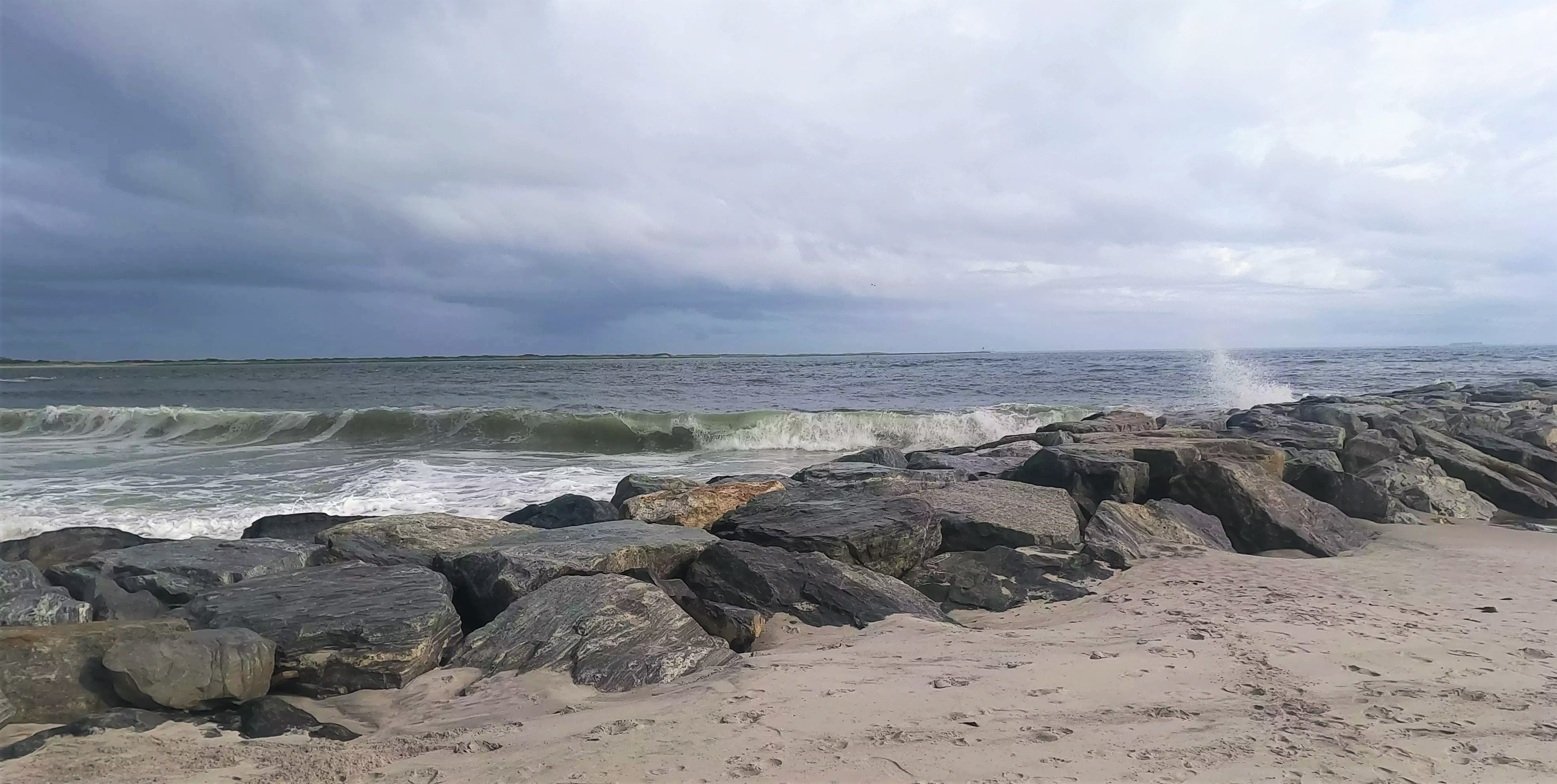
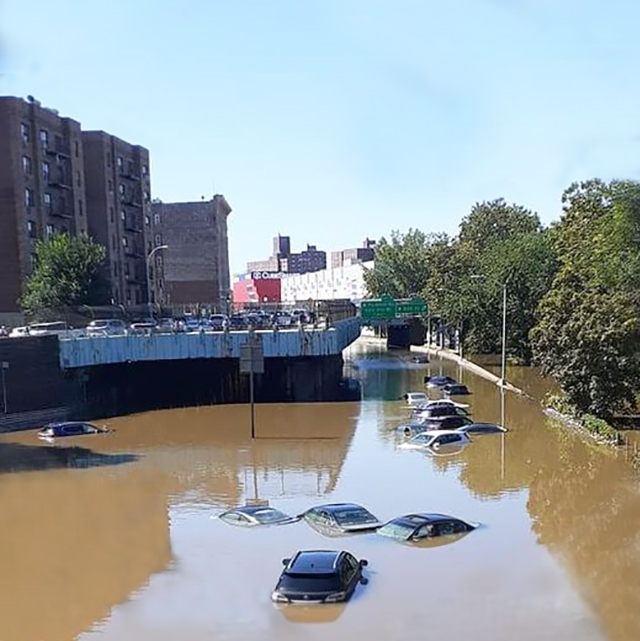
Rough surf in Point Lookout, New York prior to the arrival of Hurricane Henri (left). And significant flooding in The Bronx produced by the remnants of Hurricane Ida just weeks later (right).
- July 9, 2021: Hurricane Elsa brings heavy rain and flooding across the northeast as it made landfall on the eastern tip of Long Island, it would be the first and currently most recent tropical cyclone to make landfall in the state since Hurricane Irene in 2011. The area had already been saturated by ongoing severe thunderstorms the day prior, flooding occurred in several subway stations and roads across Manhattan and the Bronx.
- August 18, 2021: The remnants of Tropical Storm Fred causes flooding across Upstate New York. In Auburn, New York, rainfall amounted to 7.64 in (19.4 cm), while Syracuse, New York recorded 4.90 inches (124 mm) of rain. Heavy rain in Steuben County, New York triggered a flash flood emergency to be issued, requiring over 100 people to be rescued.
- August 22, 2021: Hurricane Henri passes just east of Montauk Point as a tropical storm, but pummels Long Island and New York City with heavy rain. Hurricane Henri's two day rainfall total in New York City was the largest since Hurricane Irene, and the rainfall total of 4.45 in (11.3 cm) on August 21 set a daily rainfall record. Most of Montauk shut down due to the hurricane.
- September 1, 2021: The extratropical remnants of Hurricane Ida approaches near the New York City metro area after it enters open waters, with heavy rainfall and flooding, a tornado watch was issued for the area. As the storm forced most of the subway system to shut down with many flooded stations. For the first time in the history of the city, New York City was put under a Flash Flood Emergency. It is estimated that 16 people died in the state, 13 of those in New York City, including 11 from apartment basements flooding. Damage is expected to range between $7.5–9 billion (2021 USD). New York City recorded their wettest hour in history as 3.15 in (8.0 cm) of rain fell from 8:51 pm to 9:51 pm on September 1.
- September 11, 2021: Offshore Hurricane Larry generates life-threatening surf and rip current conditions across the US East Coast, including Long Island.
- October 2, 2021: Hurricane Sam just a few weeks after Hurricane Larry also produces life-threatening surf and rip current conditions across all of the East Coast leading to the National Weather Service issuing rip current statements from South Florida to New England, with the system being around 900 miles (1,448 km) from the US Coastline. The risk of rip current conditions and life-threatening surf across the coastlines New Jersey and New York were high.
- October 26, 2021: Prior to acquiring subtropical characteristics, a Nor'easter that eventually formed into Tropical Storm Wanda would bring high winds and heavy rainfall across the northeast. A Flash Flood Emergency was issued for Moravia, and Locke in the Finger Lakes region. One fatality was reported in association to the storm where a man drowned in the Long Island Sound after attempting to kayak across the sound in the wake of the Nor’easter. According to Aon Benfield, the Nor’easter caused $200 million (2021 USD) in the Northeast.

=== 2022 ===
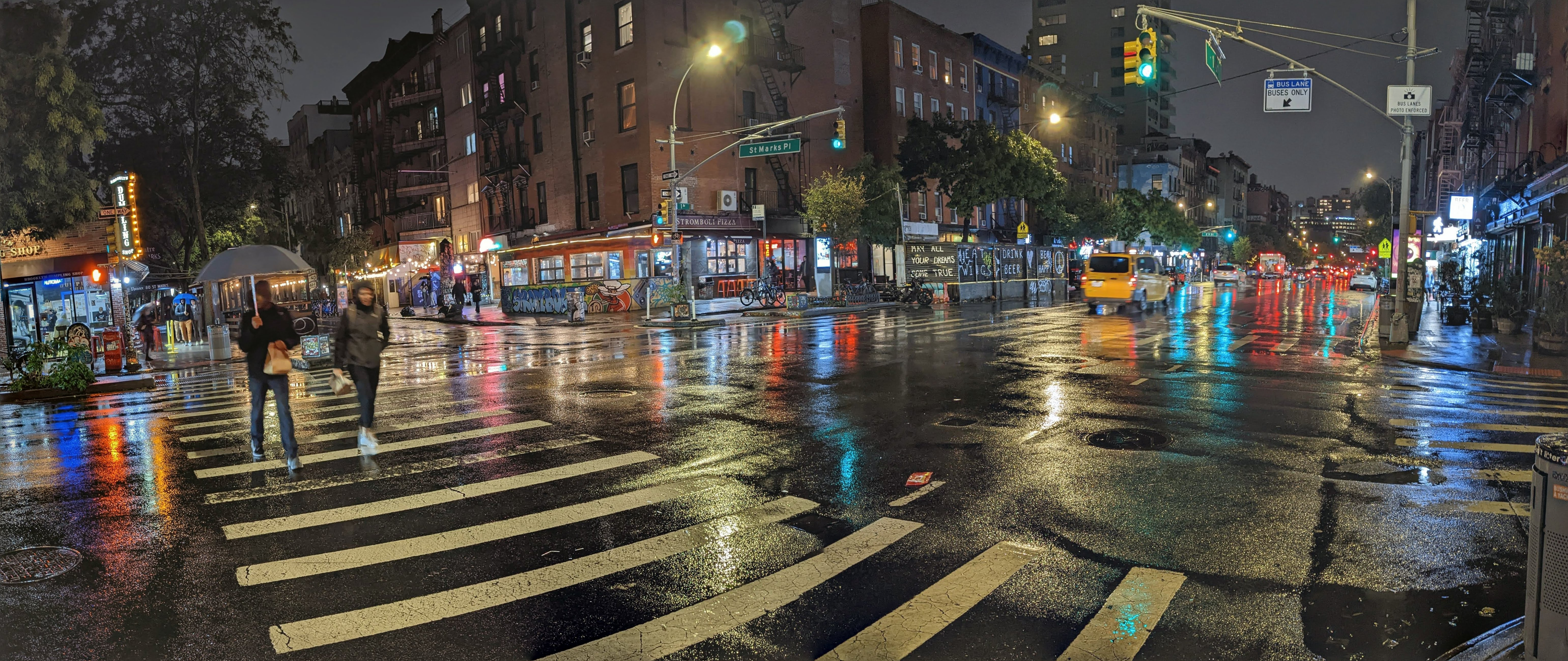
Rainfall in East Village, Manhattan associated from the remnant outer bands of Hurricane Ian.

- September 6, 2022: Offshore Hurricane Earl generates rough surf, causing significant rip currents across much of the Eastern seaboard, including all of Southern Long Island.
- September 24, 2022: The extratropical remnants of Hurricane Fiona generate swells of rip currents and high surf on the Long Island Shoreline.
- October 1–4, 2022: Prior to making a final landfall in South Carolina, Hurricane Ian forced Seastreak ferry services to suspend all services due to high winds; however, State Island Ferry and NYC Ferry continued operations. A separate low-pressure area formed to the northeast out of the post-tropical outer bands of Hurricane Ian, resulting in minor coastal flooding for New York City. The separate low-pressure system brought the coldest daily high for October 3 on record to John F. Kennedy International Airport, with a high of 52 °F (11 °C).
- November 11–12, 2022: The remnants of Hurricane Nicole which had previously been absorbed by a mid-latitude low produces heavy rainfall across the NYC metropolitan area and into Upstate New York. Power outages were reported in Orange and Rockland Counties, throughout New York and New Jersey, Orange and Rockland Utilities stated at least 900 customers were without power.

=== 2023 ===
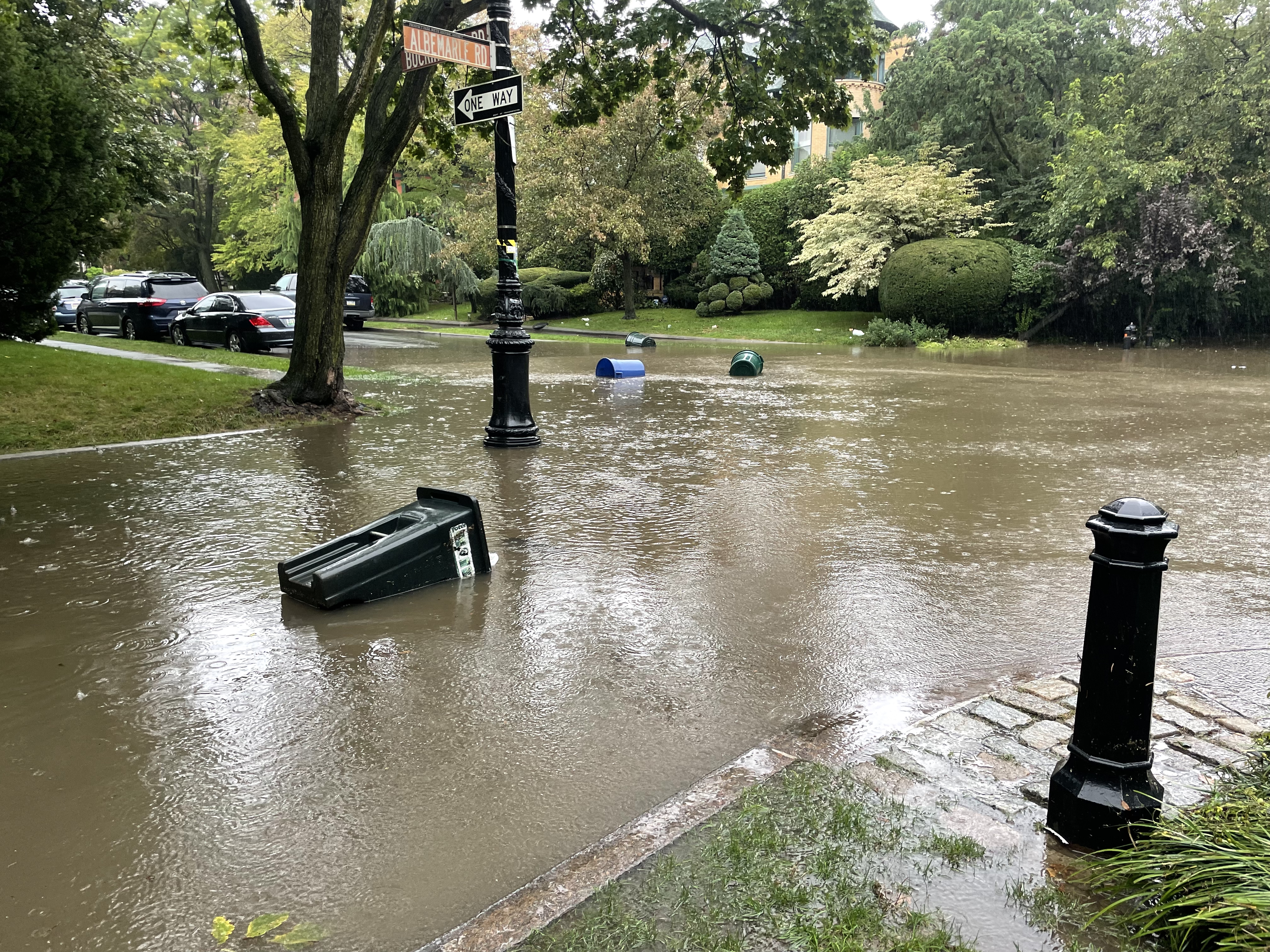
Flooding in Flatbush, Brooklyn from the indirect remnants of Ophelia.

- August 30, 2023: Hurricane Franklin brought minor coastal flooding to Staten Island, and the risk of rip currents from the system led to swimming being temporarily banned at Long Island beaches.
- September 15–16, 2023: Hurricane Lee causes beach erosion, gusty winds, and light rain to Eastern Long Island.
- September 28–30, 2023: The remnants of Tropical Storm Ophelia would be absorbed into a stalling low-pressure system causing immense rainfall, resulting in flooding across the New York City metropolitan area. JFK Intl. set a new daily rainfall record previously set by Hurricane Irene in 2011. 8.05 in (205 mm) were reported on September 29. Damage from the significant flooding is estimated to have caused $100 million (2023 USD).
- October 7, 2023: The remnants of Tropical Storm Philippe associated with a cold front would drop just a little over an inch of rain over the course of six hours along southeastern New York. Gusts reached around 20–38 mph (32–61 km/h).

=== 2024 ===
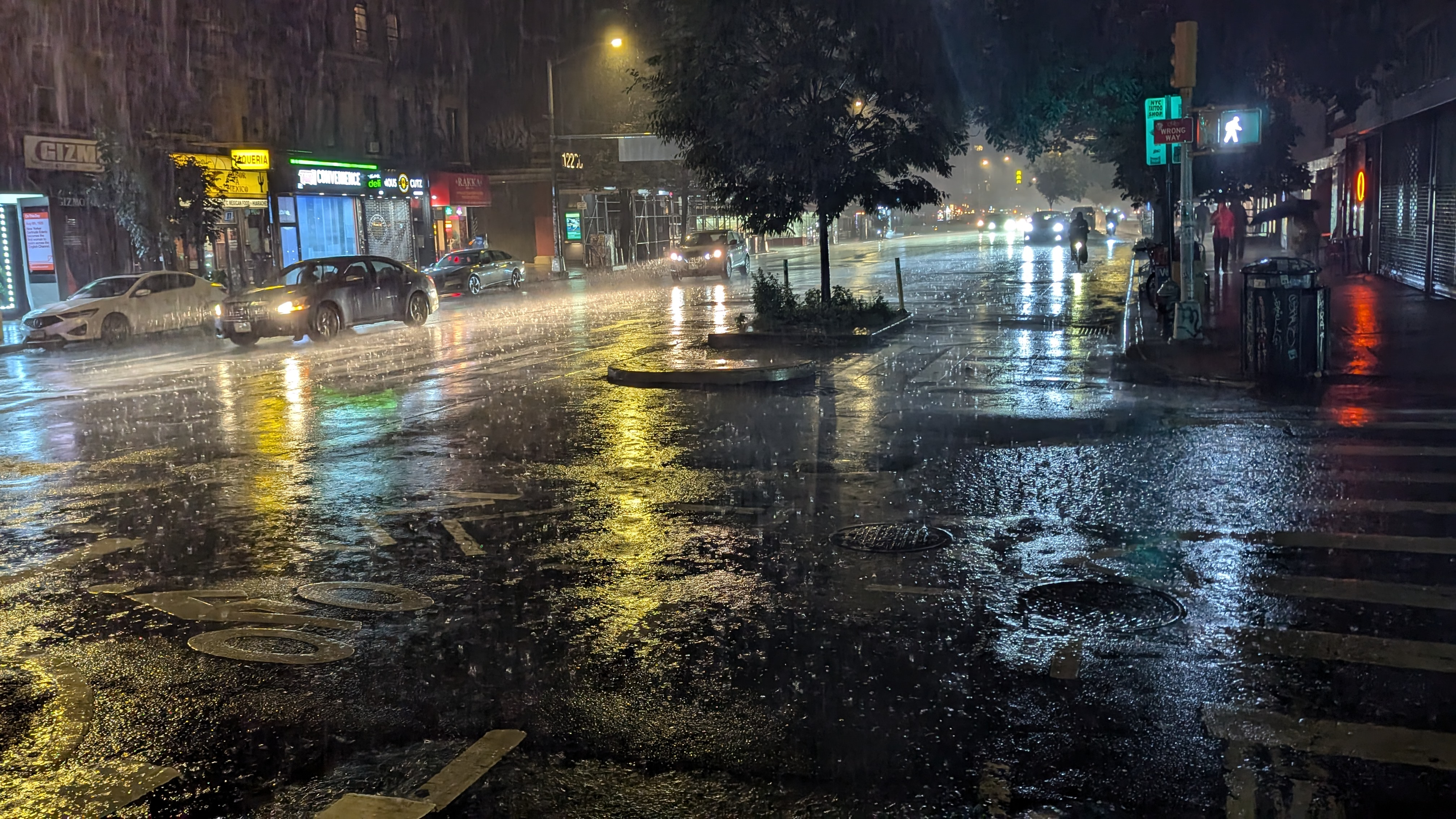
Rainfall in East Village, Manhattan from the outer bands of Subtropical Storm Debby (left), and a radar loop of a cold front band associated with the remnants of Hurricane Helene in the Tri-state area (right).
- July 10, 2024: The remnants of Hurricane Beryl brings significant rainfall across the Midwest and Northeast, Lowville, New York, recorded 6.02 in (153 mm) of rain, which broke the single day rainfall total for the town. Beryl's remnants caused a severe weather outbreak, spawning multiple tornadoes in Upstate New York. Seven in total were reported, with the most significant being a low-end EF2 tornado that destroyed multiple farm buildings near Eden, New York.
- August 7–9, 2024: The subtropical outer bands and later on the remnants of Hurricane Debby drops heavy rainfall as it moves inland the East Coast causing flooding across Long Island, the NYC metropolitan area, and Upstate New York. In Long Island, 4 in (100 mm) of rain fell, 46 mph (76 km/h) gusts were reported in Islip when the actual storm itself crossed through the area. High winds knocked down trees in New York City, in places such as Mosholu Parkway, Auburndale, Queens and near Crotona Park in the Bronx. In Upstate New York, flash flood emergencies were issued for several towns in Allegany and Steuben counties due to heavy rainfall. In addition, multiple impassable roadways were reported in Binghamton, New York. Along with significant rainfall across New York State, an EF0 tornado uprooted trees in New Paltz, New York. In all, because of the significant excessive rainfall statewide, a State of Emergency was declared by Governor Kathy Hochul for New York State. Flight cancellations in New York reached 227 at LaGuardia, 174 at Newark Liberty International Airport and 173 at John F. Kennedy International Airport. Rail service was suspended on portions of Metro-North Railroad and on the Morris & Essex Lines.
- August 17–18, 2024: Hurricane Ernesto brings life-threatening rip currents across the beaches of NYC and Long Island. In New York City, parks and beaches were closed, leading to a temporary ban on swimming.
- September 27–28, 2024: Fronts associated with the remnants of Hurricane Helene and its moisture brings light rainfall, and occasionally heavy rainfall in some places across the tri-state area and Upstate New York. Helene's rainfall in the area, specifically the tri-state area would be the last measured precipitation in that region until November in a historic dry-spell.
- October 4, 2024: Hurricane Kirk generates swells across the NYC and Long Island coastline from winds extending 200 miles (322 km) from the core of the system despite being far offshore, even with the threat of rough surf, no coastal watches or warnings were issued.

=== 2025 ===
Satellite loop of the remnants of Chantal south of Long Island (left), and another satellite loop of Hurricane Melissa interacting with a low pressure area producing heavy rainfall (right).
- July 7–8, 2025: The remnants of Tropical Storm Chantal passes just south of the NYC metropolitan area and Long Island, dropping downpours and occasionally heavy rain and thunderstorms in some spots of NYC. Lingering tropical levels of humidity caused by moisture associated with Chantal led to local heat advisories for the Tri-state area. Numerous flights at John F. Kennedy International Airport are cancelled or delayed on July 7, due to the threat of impacts from Chantal's remnants.
- August 5–6, 2025: Tropical Storm Dexter generates rough surf and rip currents across ocean facing beaches of Long Island as it lingers offshore the Eastern Seaboard.
- August 21–22, 2025: Hurricane Erin causes coastal flooding along much of the U.S. East Coast, including minor to moderate inundations in coastal New York. Swells off Rockaway Beach reached 9 ft (2.74 m). Near tropical storm-force wind gusts were recorded along Long Island as Erin traversed the region, reaching 39 mph (63 km/h) at John F. Kennedy International Airport. Beach closures were initiated prior to the arrival of the storm across Long Island beaches by the Department of Parks and Recreation and Governor Kathy Hochul. A nearby frontal boundary led to tropical moisture dispersing to the north of the NYC metro leading to spatial rainfall across areas of Westchester County, though no immediate damage or flooding were reported. One fatality was reported, a man drowned off the Fire Island National Seashore in Suffolk County from a strong rip current generated by Erin as it transitioned to a post-tropical cyclone.
- September 22–23, 2025: Hurricane Gabrielle generates swells and rough surf across areas of the New York coastline as it drifts northeastwards out to sea.
- September 29–30, 2025: Hurricane Humberto kicks up surf along Southern Long Island and the Long Island Sound with influence from Hurricane Imelda, generating rip currents off Southern Long Island as it recurves towards the open ocean.
- September 30, 2025: Hurricane Imelda produces rough surf and rip currents in Southern Long Island and the Long Island Sound as it coincides and influenced by Hurricane Humberto.
- October 30–31, 2025: Hurricane Melissa interacts with a mid-latitude cyclone steering moisture to the north towards NYC, generating heavy rainfall. Central Park recorded 1.83 in (46.48 mm) of rain which set a new daily rainfall record. At LaGuardia Airport, 0.25 in (6.4 mm) of rain fell in just seven minutes. Two storm-related fatalities were reported in association of the combination between Melissa's moisture interaction and the mid-latitude cyclone from basement flooding.

=== 2026 ===
- October 11, 2026: The remnants of Hurricane Isaias brings light rainfall, totaling around an inch (25.4 mm) across the tri-state area, a flood advisory was issued in New York City as Isaias’s heavier rain bands moved through the city.
- October 21–22: Subtropical Storm Josephine forms from a nor'easter and brings rough surf and enhanced tides across the New York coast, alongside gusty winds and minor coastal flooding. Wind gusts in Montauk, Long Island, reached 36 mph (58 km/h).

== Climatological statistics ==
Number of recorded storms affecting New York by month
Month	Number of storms
May	4
June	7
July	12
August	35
September	79
October	34
November	4

Number of recorded storms affecting New York by decade
Period	Number of storms
1950s	13
1960s	9
1970s	12
1980s	11
1990s	19
2000s	33
2010s	32
2020s	41

== Deadliest storms ==
The following table includes all storms which caused fatalities in New York State.

Total deaths
Name	Year	Number of deaths
New England	1938	60
Sandy	2012	53
New York	1893	34
Agnes	1972	24
Norfolk	1821	17
Ida	2021	17
Connie	1955	14
Five	1894	10
Edna	1954	≤8
Great Atlantic	1944	6
Irene	2011	5
Gabrielle	1989	4
Audrey	1957	4
Unnamed	1991	3
Chris	1988	3
Cristobal	2002	3
Beryl	1994	2
Bob	1991	2
Floyd	1999	2
Lorenzo	2019	2
Melissa	2025	2
Hermine	2016	2
Lee	2011	2
Hugo	1989	1
Isabel	2003	1
Belle	1976	1
Gloria	1985	1
Frances	2004	1
Tammy	2005	1
Isaac	2000	1
Fay	2020	1
Isaias	2020	1
Irene	2005	1
Luis	1995	1
Erin	2025	1
Eloise	1975	1
Carol	1954	1
Galveston	1900	1
New Jersey	1903	1
Diane	1955	1
Ida	2009	1
Nicole	2010	1
Wanda	2021	1

== See also ==
- List of New Jersey hurricanes
- List of New England hurricanes
- List of Pennsylvania hurricanes
- List of North Carolina hurricanes
- List of Florida hurricanes
- New York Harbor Storm-Surge Barrier
