= Hurricane Lorenzo (2007) =

Category 1 Atlantic hurricane in 2007

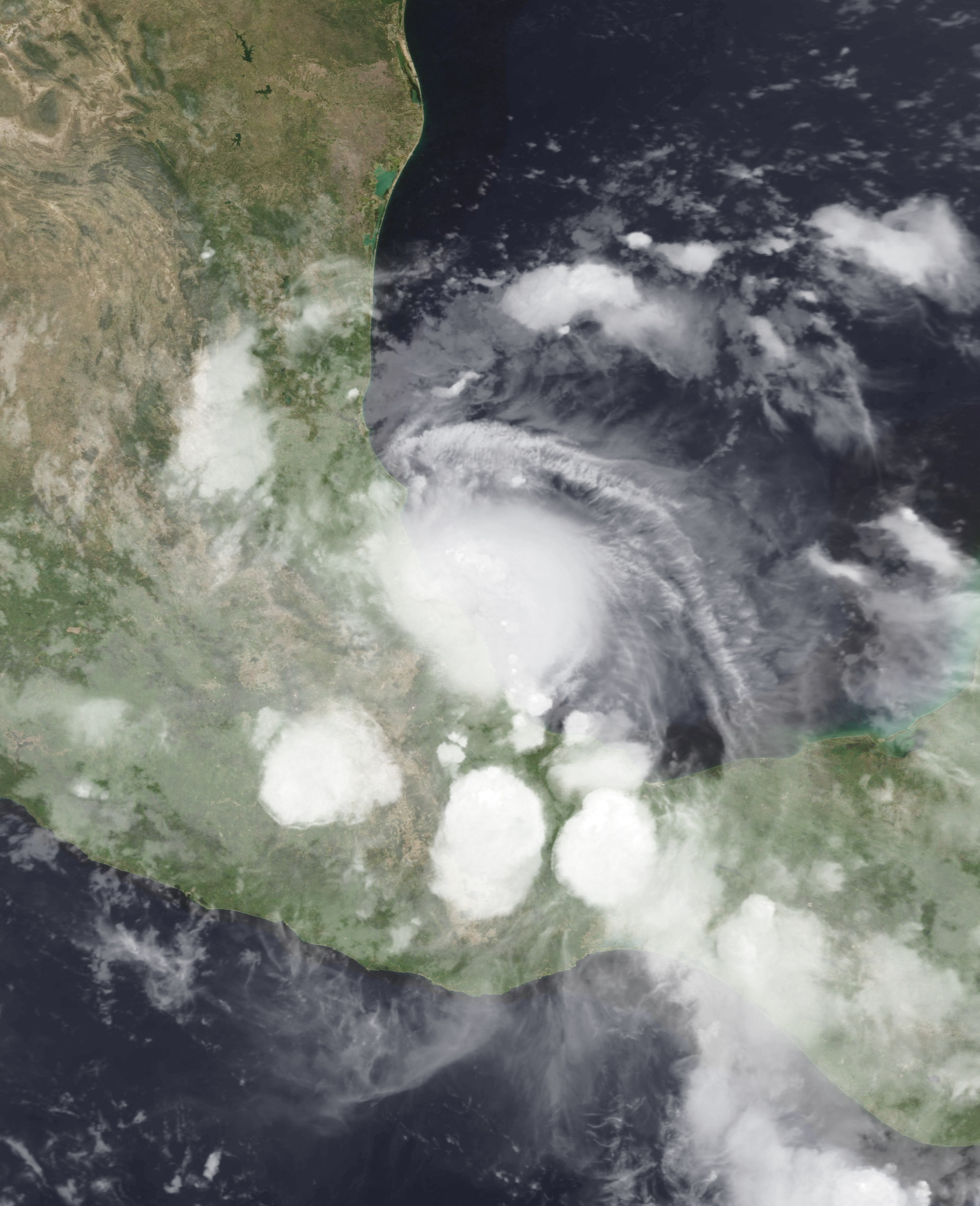
- Hurricane Lorenzo making landfall in Veracruz on September 27

Meteorological history
- Formed: September 25, 2007
- Dissipated: September 28, 2007

Category 1 hurricane
- 1-minute sustained (SSHWS/NWS)
- Highest winds: 80 mph (130 km/h)
- Lowest pressure: 990 mbar (hPa); 29.23 inHg

Overall effects
- Fatalities: 7 direct
- Damage: $92.3 million (2007 USD)
- Areas affected: Mexico
- IBTrACS
- Part of the 2007 Atlantic hurricane season

Hurricane Lorenzo was a rapidly developing tropical cyclone that struck the Mexican state of Veracruz in late September 2007. The twelfth named storm and fifth hurricane of the 2007 Atlantic hurricane season, it formed in the southwestern Gulf of Mexico from a tropical wave. After meandering for two days without development, the storm began a steady westward track as its structure became better organized. In an 18‑hour period, Lorenzo's winds increased from 35 mph (55 km/h) to 80 mph (130 km/h), or from a tropical depression to a hurricane. On September 28 it struck near Tecolutla, Veracruz, a month after Hurricane Dean affected the same area, before it quickly dissipated over land.

The most significantly affected area was Veracruz, where damage reached over $1 billion pesos ($92 million 2007 USD). Most of it came from road damage in the state's northern portion, although there were also hundreds of damaged houses. Between Veracruz and neighboring Hidalgo, there were 123,320 people affected across 112 municipalities. Overall there were seven deaths in the country, one in Veracruz and six in Puebla. In the latter state, a family of three perished in a landslide.

== Meteorological history ==
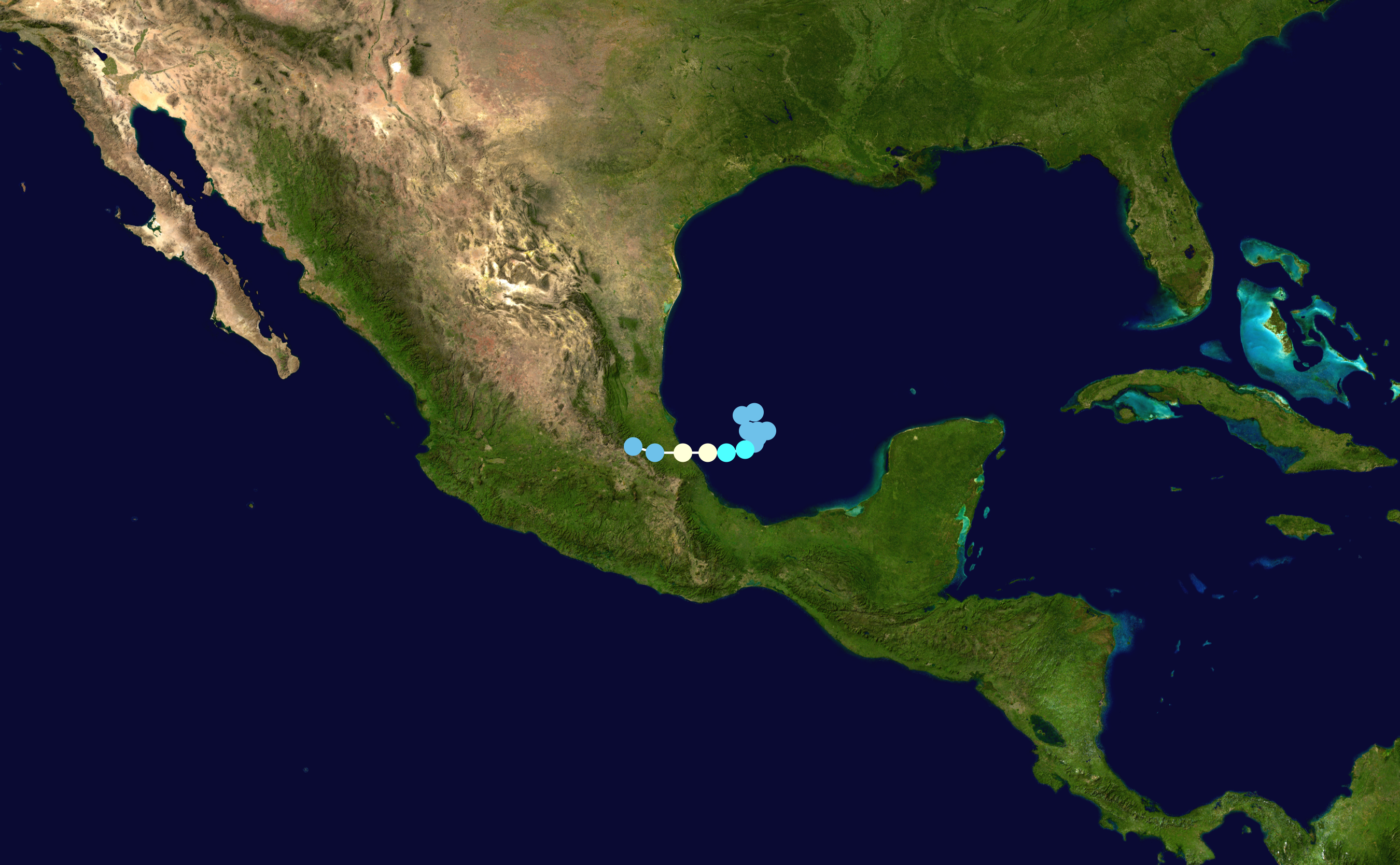
Map plotting the storm's track and intensity, according to the Saffir–Simpson scale Map key Saffir–Simpson scale Tropical depression (≤38 mph, ≤62 km/h) Tropical storm (39–73 mph, 63–118 km/h) Category 1 (74–95 mph, 119–153 km/h) Category 2 (96–110 mph, 154–177 km/h) Category 3 (111–129 mph, 178–208 km/h) Category 4 (130–156 mph, 209–251 km/h) Category 5 (≥157 mph, ≥252 km/h) Unknown Storm type Tropical cyclone Subtropical cyclone Extratropical cyclone, remnant low, tropical disturbance, or monsoon depression

The origins of Hurricane Lorenzo were from a tropical wave that exited the coast of Africa on September 11. After moving across the tropical Atlantic Ocean, it traversed much of the Caribbean Sea before developing an area of thunderstorms on September 21. The system developed a low pressure area on September 23 after the northern portion of the wave broke off and crossed the Yucatán Peninsula. Initially, a Hurricane Hunters flight was scheduled to investigate the system, although the low became disorganized over the southeastern Gulf of Mexico due to high wind shear. However, the wind shear decreased, and late on September 25, another Hurricane Hunters flight indicated the development of a closed low-level circulation. Based on that observation, along with sufficient persistence of the thunderstorms, the system developed into Tropical Depression Thirteen about 190 mi (305 km) east of Tampico, Tamaulipas.

Upon developing, the depression was located in an area of weak steering currents, resulting in an erratic movement generally to the south. In its formative stages, the depression executed a small loop. As it did so, it moved into an area of very warm waters and decreasing wind shear. The depression's convection gradually organized, although the winds were slower to increase. An anticyclone became established over the system, and the depression intensified into Tropical Storm Lorenzo at around 1200 UTC on September 27. At the time, it was located about 150 mi (240 km) east of Tuxpan, Veracruz, moving steadily westward under the influence of a building ridge to its east. As it approached the coast, Lorenzo rapidly intensified unexpectedly, and within 12 hours of attaining tropical storm status it strengthened into a hurricane.

Hurricane Lorenzo quickly developed a closed eyewall, which was observed on radar and provided a peak intensity estimate of 80 mph (130 km/h) at 0000 UTC on September 28. The cyclone maintained vigorous and symmetric convection across the center, although the structure deteriorated slightly before Lorenzo crossed the coast near Tecolutla, Veracruz at 0500 UTC that day, with winds estimated around 75 mph (120 km/h). After making landfall, the hurricane rapidly weakened to tropical depression intensity. Progressing inland, the circulation became difficult to locate as the convection diminished to rainbands along the coast. Within 19 hours after moving ashore, the circulation of Lorenzo dissipated, therefore ending its duration as a tropical cyclone.

== Preparations and impact ==
Tropical Depression Thirteen meandering in the Bay of Campeche on September 26

About 26 hours before landfall, the Mexican government issued a tropical storm watch from Palma Sola to La Cruz in Veracruz. About 14 hours before landfall, a tropical storm warning was put into place from Palma Sola to Cabo Rojo, which in turn was upgraded to a hurricane warning six hours later. Mexico's Civilian Protection officials declared a "red alert" for much of the state of Veracruz. Along the coast of Veracruz, officials canceled school classes. Officials opened 315 shelters in Veracruz, along with six in neighboring Hidalgo, which housed 45,164 people during the storm. The government of Veracruz provided buses for people to transport from their houses to the shelters. Ports in Tecolutla, Tuxpan and Nautla were forced to close. Lorenzo's formation caused gas prices to rise due to its potential to disrupt oil facilities in the Gulf of Mexico.

Hurricane Lorenzo made landfall in Veracruz, the same region of east-central Mexico as Hurricane Dean did one month prior. The hurricane primarily affected small fishing villages along the coast, where strong winds knocked down power lines, leaving about 85,000 people across fifteen municipalities without electricity. To prevent the danger of fallen wires, officials shut off the power grid in several municipalities in northern Veracruz. The winds also destroyed the roofs of several houses in Nautla. In addition to the high winds, Lorenzo dropped heavy rainfall along the coast and further inland, peaking at 12.83 in (326 mm) in El Raudal, Veracruz. The rains caused flash flooding and mudslides that killed at least four people, including a family of three in Puebla state. Landslides also closed portions of three highways. In some locations, floodwaters reached about 1 foot (300 mm) in depth. The combination of winds and rains damaged 169 houses in Puebla, while in Hidalgo, the San Lorenzo River overflowed its banks and forced the evacuation of over 200 people. Overflown rivers in Veracruz forced about 25,000 people to leave their houses. Along the Cazones River, more than 1,000 houses were flooded, resulting in local police officials to assist in evacuations. At least 30 towns were isolated. In Casitas, approximately 300 palapas were destroyed. Approximately 100,000 hectares of banana, orange, lemon, corn, vanilla, and beans were damaged. Heavy rainfall flooded 200 schools. Ten people were rescued from their flooded homes. At least 2,000 homes had their roofs blown off by strong winds and more than 30,000 people were forced to flee from their homes. Damage in Veracruz was estimated at $1 billion pesos ($92 million 2007 USD), much of it from road damage in the northern portion of the state.

Overall, the hurricane affected 123,320 people across Veracruz and Hidalgo, prompting the declaration of a state of emergency in 112 municipalities. The declaration allowed the usage of emergency resources for the affected people. In Ixtaczoquitla, a 26-year-old woman, a five-year-old girl, and a three-year-old girl, were killed after being buried by a landslide. In Jopala, a twelve-year-old girl was killed after being buried by a landslide. Additionally two men were swept away by an overflowing river. One of them was rescued, but the other was unable to be rescued and later drowned. In San Pedro Tlaolantongo, a ten-year-old boy drowned after being swept away by an overflowing river. In Veracruz, an 83-year-old man drowned after falling into a well. Additionally, three others were injured after being buried by a landslide. By about three days after the storm, all schools were reopened. The Mexican government distributed food, water, and construction materials for the areas most affected in Veracruz. Following the storm, about 500 power workers were dispatched in Veracruz to restore electricity in the affected areas.

In Texas, a remnant surface trough from Lorenzo fueled severe thunderstorms throughout the state. An EF1 tornado was reported, uprooting trees and damaging structures. Several street signs were downed and vehicles were damaged. One person was injured after they were struck by flying glass. An EF0 tornado was reported, causing minor roof damage to several homes. Damage in the region totaled to US$255,000.

== See also ==
- Other storms of the same name
- Tropical cyclones in 2007
- Timeline of the 2007 Atlantic hurricane season
- List of Category 1 Atlantic hurricanes
- Hurricane Karl (2010)
- Hurricane Nate (2011)
- Hurricane Ingrid (2013)
- Hurricane Katia (2017)
