= List of storms named Lorenzo =

The name Lorenzo has been used for five tropical cyclones in the Atlantic Ocean, replacing the name Luis after 1995.

- Tropical Storm Lorenzo (2001), weak storm that formed at sea before becoming extratropical
- Hurricane Lorenzo (2007), a Category 1 hurricane that struck Veracruz, caused significant damage
- Tropical Storm Lorenzo (2013), moderate storm that formed at sea; its remnants contributed to the formation of the St. Jude storm which affected Europe
- Hurricane Lorenzo (2019), the easternmost Category 5 hurricane on record, impacted Ireland and parts of United Kingdom while extratropical
- Tropical Storm Lorenzo (2025), a strong tropical storm that meandered in the open ocean
