= Gustav =

Gustav, Gustaf or Gustave may refer to:

- Gustav (name), a male given name of Old Swedish origin

== Art, entertainment, and media ==
- Gustav (film series), a Hungarian series of animated short cartoons
- Gustav, a character in Sesamstraße
- Monsieur Gustav H., a leading character in The Grand Budapest Hotel
- Gustaf, an American art punk band from Brooklyn, New York.

== Weapons ==
- Carl Gustav recoilless rifle, dubbed "the Gustav" by US soldiers
- Schwerer Gustav, 800-mm German siege cannon used during World War II

== Other uses ==
- Gustav (pigeon), a pigeon of the RAF pigeon service in WWII
- Gustave (crocodile), a large male Nile crocodile in Burundi
- Gustave, South Dakota
- Hurricane Gustav (disambiguation), a name used for several tropical cyclones and storms
- Gustav, a streetwear clothing brand

== See also ==
- Gustav of Sweden (disambiguation)
- Gustav Adolf (disambiguation)
- Gustave Eiffel (disambiguation)
- Gustavo (disambiguation)
- Gustavs (name)
- Gustavsen
- Gustavus (disambiguation)
- Gustafson, also Gustafsson, Gustavson, or Gustavsson
- Gustaw, Afghanistan
