= Gustav Adolf =

Gustav Adolf or Gustaf Adolf may refer to:

== People ==
- Gustavus Adolphus (1594–1632), or Gustaf II Adolf, King of Sweden 1611–1632
- Gustav IV Adolf (1778–1837), King of Sweden 1792–1809
- Gustaf VI Adolf (1882–1973), King of Sweden 1950–1973
- Prince Gustaf Adolf, Duke of Västerbotten (1906–1947), son of Gustaf VI Adolf, father of Carl XVI Gustaf of Sweden
- Gustav Adolph, Count of Nassau-Saarbrücken (1632–1677), ruling prince in the Holy Roman Empire
- Gustav Adolph, Duke of Mecklenburg-Güstrow (1633–1695), last ruler of Mecklenburg-Güstrow
- Gustaf Adolf Lewenhaupt (1619–1656), Swedish soldier and statesman.
- Gustav Adolf Bergenroth (1813–1869), German historian
- Gustav Adolf Deissmann (1866–1937), German Protestant theologian
- Gustav Adolf Fischer (1848–1886), German explorer of Africa
- Gustav Adolf Michaelis (1798–1848), German obstetrician
- Gustav Adolf Scheel (1907–1979), German physician and commander of the Sicherheitspolizei in the Third Reich
- Gustav-Adolf Schur (born 1931), former German cyclist
- Gustav Adolf Steengracht von Moyland (1902–1969), German diplomat and politician
- Gustav Adolf von Götzen (1866–1910), German explorer and Governor of German East Africa
- Gustav-Adolf von Zangen (1892–1964), German general and commander of the German 15th Army
- Gustaf Adolf Westring (1900–1963), Swedish Air Force lieutenant general

== Places ==
- Gustav Adolf Grammar School, in Tallinn, Estonia
- Gustav Adolf Stave Church, in Hahnenklee, Harz, Germany
- Gustav-Adolf-Straße station, a metro station in Nuremberg, Germany
- Gustav Adolfs torg, Stockholm, a public square in Stockholm, Sweden
- Gustavus Adolphus College, in St. Peter, Minnesota, United States
- Royal Gustavus Adolphus Academy, in Uppsala, Sweden
- Gustav Adolfs, the Swedish name of the municipality Hartola in Finland

== Other ==
- Gustavus Adolphus Day, November 6
- Gustavus Adolphus pastry
- Gustav-Adolf-Werk
- Gustav Adolph (barque) (1879-1902), Norwegian barque wrecked near Port Elizabeth

== See also ==
- Gustav (disambiguation)
