= List of Maryland hurricanes =

Hurricane Isabel, one of the most significant storms to affect the region, on September 18, 2003

Since 1950, 152 known hurricanes, tropical storms and tropical depressions have affected the U.S. state of Maryland. Many of these storms also affect the country's capital, Washington, D.C., since the city is located on territory ceded by Maryland. Hurricanes are the most intense classification of these storms, while tropical storms and tropical depressions are generally weaker. The Delmarva Peninsula is often affected by cyclones that brush the East Coast. Central and Western Maryland, as well as Washington, D.C., commonly receive rainfall from the remnants of storms that make landfall elsewhere and track northward. On rare occasions, the area experiences the effects of Pacific storms; one such example of this is Hurricane Tico, which made landfall on Mexico and moved inland.

Hurricane Agnes of the 1972 season was the deadliest storm, killing 19 people as a result of heavy flooding. The most damaging storm was Hurricane Irene, which resulted in $151 million in damage. Hurricane Hazel caused sustained hurricane-force winds (winds of 75 mph (120 km/h) or greater) in the state, the only storm during the time period to do so. No storms made landfall in Maryland at hurricane intensity. Since 1950, fifteen tropical cyclones have collectively killed 71 people.

== Storms ==
=== Pre–1900 ===
- October 23, 1878- An unnamed category 2 hurricane mostly known as the "Gale of '78" struck the state causing damage to the Baltimore/Washington region.
- October 13-14, 1893- An unnamed category 1 hurricane moved through the region causing minor damage.
- September 30, 1896- An unnamed category 1 hurricane moved though Southern Maryland and parts of Virginia.

=== 1950–1959 ===
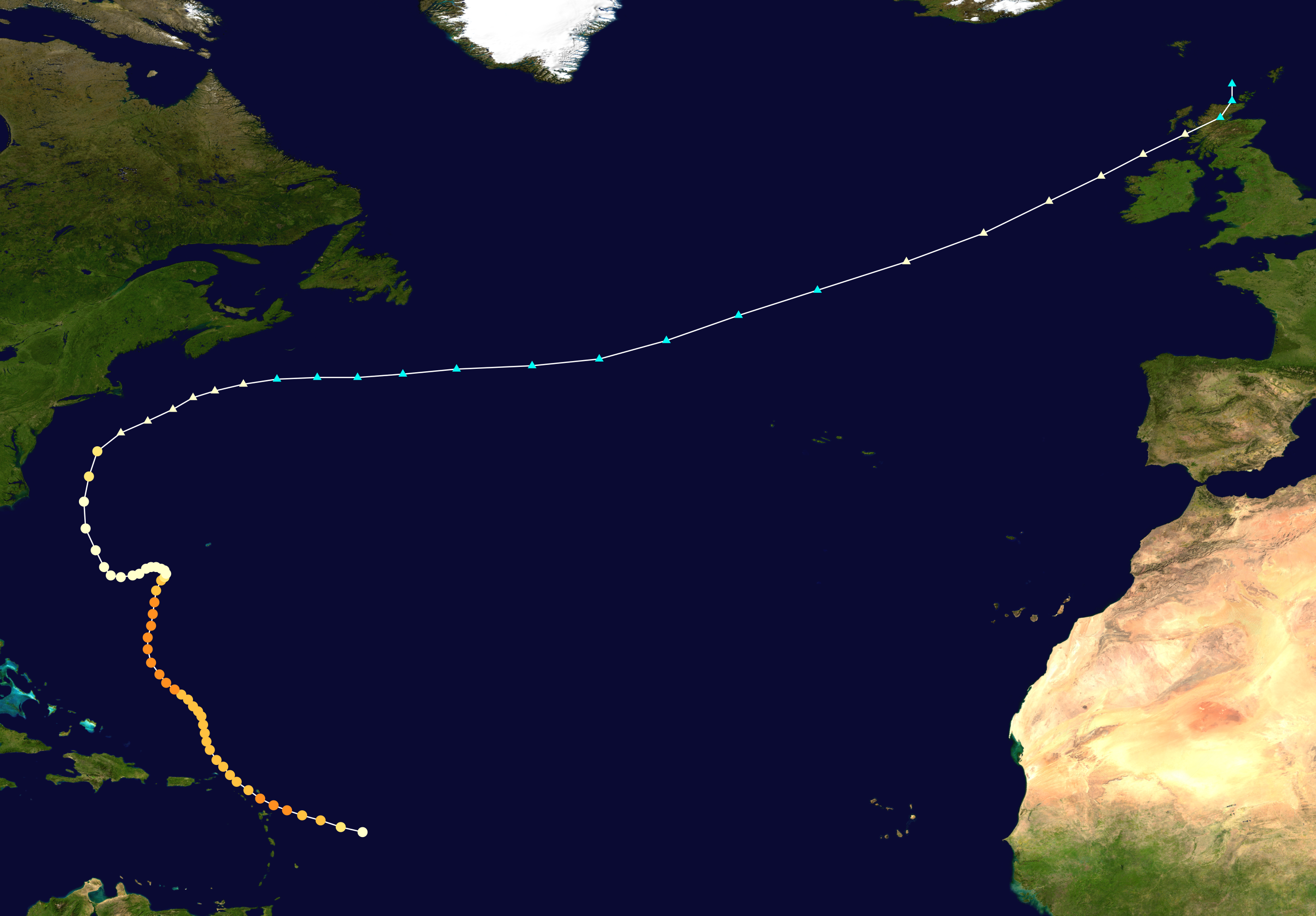
Hurricane Dog track

- September 9, 1950 – Outer moisture from Hurricane Dog dropped heavy rainfall in the Mid-Atlantic. In Bel Air, a car drove into the swollen Gunpowder River; three people in the car drowned and a fourth was injured.
- September 1, 1952 – Tropical Storm Able crossed the state, although damage, if any, is unknown.
- October 15, 1954 – Hurricane Hazel crossed the state, producing hurricane-force winds. In addition to wind damage, flooding was severe along the Chesapeake Bay, while flash flooding was reported inland. Overall, six deaths and about $11 million in damage were reported.
- August 12, 1955 – Tropical Storm Connie caused widespread damage, including where the storm's center passed directly over St. Mary's, Calvert, and Anne Arundel Counties. It dropped heavy rainfall, peaking at 12.32 in (313 mm) in Preston. The rainfall led to flooding which caused $2.5 million in damage. When the schooner Levin J. Marvel capsized in high seas, 14 people drowned.
- August 18, 1955 – As Tropical Storm Diane began its turn to the east-northeast over Virginia, associated heavy rains, combined with saturated grounds from Connie just days before, caused flooding in central parts of the state, especially along the Potomac River.
- September 19, 1955 – Hurricane Ione made landfall in North Carolina; its outer moisture produced light rainfall across the state.
- September 28, 1956 – Hurricane Flossy passed southeast of the state, producing up to 3.30 in (84 mm) of rain. In nearby Washington, D.C., a peak wind gust of 45 mph (72 km/h) was reported.
- September 28, 1958 – Hurricane Helene remained well off of the Carolina coast, though light rain fell across the Mid-Atlantic states.
- September 30, 1959 – The remnants of Hurricane Gracie dropped moderate rainfall over western Maryland.

=== 1960–1969 ===
- July 30, 1960 – Tropical Storm Brenda crossed southeastern Maryland. The storm's rainfall caused flooding in St. Mary's County.
- September 12, 1960 – Hurricane Donna passed just offshore, producing wind gusts of over 100 mph (160 km/h) in Ocean City. Flooding along the eastern shore caused two deaths.
- September 21, 1961 – Hurricane Esther moved northward, parallel to the coast. Wind gusts to 45 mph (70 km/h) were observed at Ocean City, and storm surge flooding caused damage to the city's sea wall and boardwalk.

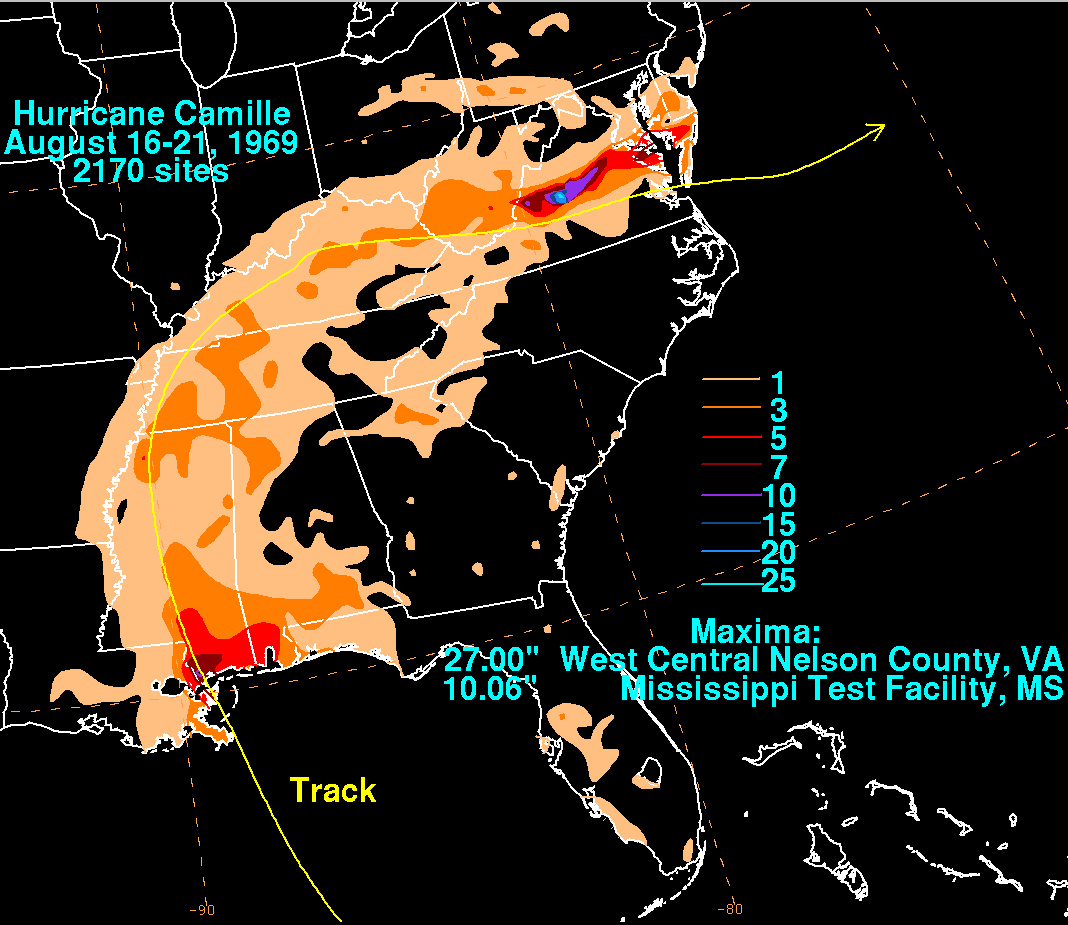
Camille rainfall map

- September 1, 1964 – In Westernport, 5.80 in (147 mm) of rain fell as Tropical Storm Cleo tracked just south of the state.
- October 4, 1964 – The remnants of Hurricane Hilda caused light to moderate precipitation.
- October 17, 1964 – The remnants of Hurricane Isbell dropped light rainfall.
- September 13, 1965 – The remnants of Hurricane Betsy produced light rainfall across western part of the state.
- September 16, 1967 – Tropical Storm Doria made landfall in Virginia; associated high seas damaged the boardwalk at Ocean City.
- June 13, 1968 – Tropical Depression Abby produced 3.83 in (97 mm) of rainfall at Centreville.
- June 26, 1968 – The remnants of Tropical Storm Candy dropped moderate rainfall.
- September 11, 1968 – Tropical Depression Fourteen produced 4.68 in (119 mm) of rain near Parkton.
- October 20, 1968 – As Hurricane Gladys paralleled the east coast, tides of up to 4 ft (1.2 m) were felt along the coast. As a result, street flooding was reported in Ocean City.
- August 20, 1969 – The remnants of Hurricane Camille caused extensive flooding in Virginia, though they drop only moderate rainfall peaking at 6.55 in (166 mm) in Maryland.
- September 9, 1969 – Hurricane Gerda intensified offshore, prompting a hurricane watch for eastern Maryland. Because the storm remained offshore, only light precipitation fell.

=== 1970–1979 ===
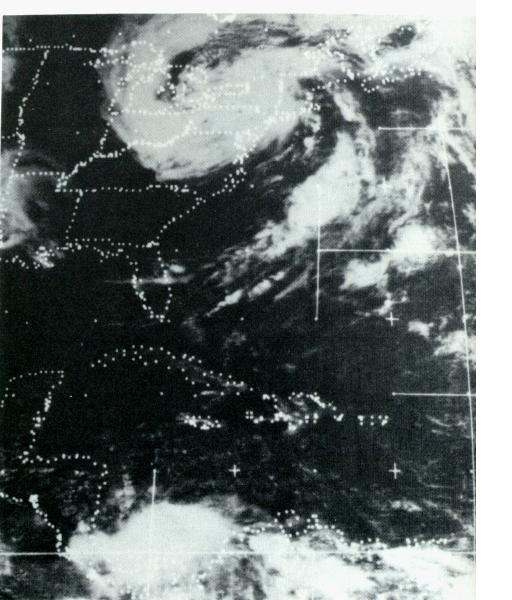
Remnants of Agnes over northeastern United States

- August 28, 1971 – Tropical Storm Doria paralleled the east coast, resulting in tides 2.7 feet (0.8 m) above normal in Fort McHenry.
- September 13, 1971 – Tropical Storm Heidi passed offshore, dropping 2.86 in (73 mm) of rain in parts of the state.
- Early October 1971 – The remnants of Hurricane Ginger after making landfall in North Carolina, turned north-northeast, and brushed southern Maryland with light rainfall.
- June 2, 1972 – Heavy rainfall from Tropical Storm Agnes, combined with a separate low to the west, contributed to the state's worst flooding in 36 years. Severe damage and at least 19 deaths were reported throughout the region. Throughout the state, 1,930 were damaged, of which 103 were destroyed. 17 farm buildings were destroyed and 44 damaged, and 82 small businesses were destroyed. Total damage was estimated at $80 million.
- September 3, 1972 – Tropical Storm Carrie remained well offshore, though its outer bands dropped light precipitation across the southern Delmarva Peninsula.
- September 23–26, 1975 – Hurricane Eloise became an extratropical frontal low over Virginia. The storm's moisture dropped 14.23 in (361 mm) of rain in Westminster, causing severe flooding, particularly in the Monocacy and Patapsco River basins.
- October 27, 1975 – Tropical Storm Hallie became extratropical to the east of the state; light rain fell over the southern Delmarva Peninsula.
- August 9, 1976 – Hurricane Belle paralleled the east coast, prompting hurricane warnings for the coastline. The center of the storm passed to the east of the state, producing wind gusts of around 70 mph (110 km/h) at Ocean City.
- Mid-September 1976 – Subtropical Storm Three became extratropical to the south of the state. The resulting low moved northward, dropping moderate rainfall.
- July 29–31, 1979 – The remnants of Tropical Storm Claudette dropped light, spotty rainfall in southern areas.
- September 5, 1979 – Tropical Storm David crossed the western part of the state, dropping up to 9.40 in (239 mm) of rainfall. Associated bands spawned seven tornadoes throughout the state. One of the tornadoes struck near Crofton, causing tree and structure damage, as well as one injury.

=== 1980–1989 ===
- June 7, 1981 – A tropical depression moved off the Mid-Atlantic coast, brushing the southern tip of Maryland with light rainfall.
- July 1, 1981 – Tropical Storm Bret made landfall in Maryland, although there was no reported damage.
- August 19, 1981 – Tropical Storm Dennis brushed the extreme southern section of the Delmarva Peninsula, with light rainfall.
- September 30, 1983 – Tropical Storm Dean made landfall in Virginia and produced up to 1.32 in (34 mm) of rainfall in the state.
- October 25, 1983 – The remnants of Hurricane Tico, a Pacific storm, dropped light rainfall across Maryland and surrounding locations.

Hurricane Gloria moving away from the Maryland coast on September 27

- July 25, 1985 – The remnants of Hurricane Bob caused moderate rainfall in southern Maryland, and light wind gusts. Rough seas from the system capsized a few boats along the Potomac River, and the rainfall collapsed a house under construction in Great Falls, Maryland.
- August 18, 1985 – Remnant moisture from Hurricane Danny dropped up to 7 in (180 mm) of rain on the Delmarva Peninsula, although damage, if any is unknown.
- September 24, 1985 – Tropical Storm Henri paralleled the coastline, dropping light rainfall.
- September 27, 1985 – Hurricane Gloria passed east of Maryland and dropped over 7 in (180 mm) of rain. Wind gusts to 40 mph (64 km/h) blasted the coastline, causing beach erosion.
- August 18, 1986 – Hurricane Charley tracked just miles offshore, spawning wind gusts up to 35 mph (56 km/h). The storm also dropped up to 4.50 in (114 mm) of rain in Maryland.
- September 1987 – Tropical Depression Nine produced up to 5 in (130 mm) of rainfall throughout the area.
- August 28, 1988 – The state received light rainfall caused by Tropical Storm Chris.
- Mid-October 1989 – The remnants of Hurricane Jerry tracked eastward off the Mid-Atlantic coast, dropping light amounts of rainfall in northern locales.

=== 1990–1994 ===
- Mid-October 1990 – The remnants of Tropical Storm Marco produced moderate rainfall in western locations.
- August 19, 1991 – Hurricane Bob passed 90 mi (140 km) offshore, producing waves of up to 12 ft (3.7 m) high.
- Late August 1992 – Remnant moisture from Hurricane Andrew produced up to 2.70 in (69 mm) of rain in western areas of the state.

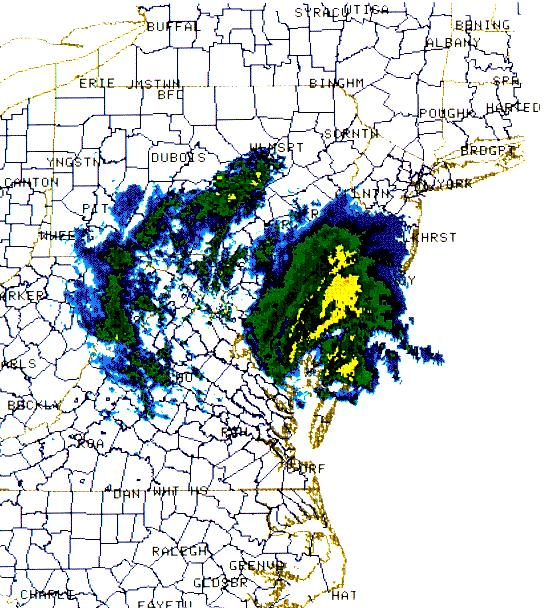
Radar image of Tropical Storm Danielle making landfall

- September 25, 1992 – Tropical Storm Danielle made landfall on the Delmarva Peninsula, producing winds of 53 mph (85 km/h) in Ocean City. Storm tide ranged from an estimated storm tide of 2–3 feet (0.6–0.9 m). The storm produced moderate rainfall of over three inches (76 mm) across the Eastern Shore of Maryland.
- September 1, 1993 – Uncertainty in the track of Hurricane Emily track prompted voluntary evacuations of Ocean City, although the storm quickly turned away from the state.
- July 21, 1994 – Tropical Depression Two passed just west of the western border with light precipitation.
- August 18, 1994 – Tropical Storm Beryl's remnants tracked over western Maryland, producing light rainfall.
- November 20, 1994 – Hurricane Gordon dissipated over South Carolina, dropping light to moderate rainfall over the southern Delmarva Peninsula.

=== 1995–1999 ===
- June 6, 1995 – The remnants of Hurricane Allison produced light showers in some locations, amounting to less than an inch.
- August 6, 1995 – Remnant moisture from Hurricane Erin produced 4.53 in (115 mm) of rainfall in Chestertown.
- October 3, 1995 – The remnants of Hurricane Opal tracked well west of Maryland, producing light rainfall across the entire state. Moderate winds downed trees and tree limbs onto Maryland Route 495. The system spawned numerous tornadoes, the most notable of which contained winds of 150 mph (240 km/h); this particular tornado resulted in three injuries and damaged over 100 homes.

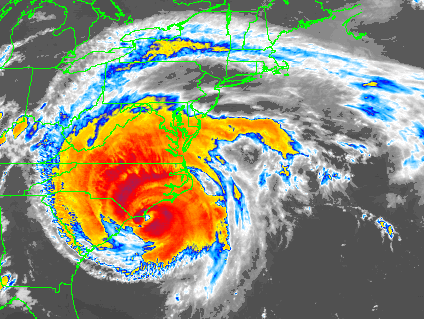
Hurricane Fran affecting Maryland while making landfall

- July 13, 1996 – Tropical Storm Bertha passed over the state producing wind gusts peaking at 63 mph (101 km/h) at Ocean City. Several trees and power lines were downed resulting in scattered power outages and property damage. In Dorchester, one tornado was confirmed. Also, rainfall of up to 5 in (130 mm) caused some street flooding.
- September 6, 1996 – Tropical Storm Fran tracked west of the state, spawning wind gusts of up to 55 mph (89 km/h) which, combined with saturated soil, downed numerous trees. Along the Chesapeake Bay, a storm surge of up to 6 ft (1.8 m) inundated coastal communities. This caused tidal flooding which resulted in one injury and forced several people to evacuate. The heavy rainfall severely flooded the Potomac River, damaging over 500 homes and destroying nearly 450 acres (1.8 km^{2}) of corn and soy crops. As a result of Fran, one death was reported, and $50 million (1996 USD, $68 million 2008 USD) in damage was blamed on the storm.
- October 8, 1996 – Moisture from Tropical Storm Josephine moved northward along the East Coast. Up to 3.5 in (89 mm) of rainfall was reported, resulting in the flooding of numerous roads. The Coast Guard station in Ocean City recorded a wind gust of 77 mph (124 km/h) which resulted in several downed trees and power lines. The winds broke loose a 160 ft (49 m) barge from its moorings.
- July 24, 1997 – Tropical Storm Danny passed south of the state, dropping up to 5 in (130 mm) in southernmost locations. Because of a previous drought, there were no reports of flooding except for minor drainage ditch overflows.
- August 5, 1998 – The remnants of Hurricane Earl tracked south of the state, producing light rainfall on the Delmarva Peninsula.
- August 28, 1998 – Assateague Island reported 2.37 in (60 mm) of rainfall from Hurricane Bonnie which tracked offshore in the Atlantic.
- September 4, 1999 – The remnants of Hurricane Dennis dropped heavy rainfall which surpassed 4 in (100 mm). On the coast of Maryland, tides were up to 3 ft (0.91 m) above average. In Havre de Grace, four people were seriously injured when a car crossed the median and slammed into an oncoming vehicle, which was blamed on heavy rainfall. Two or more lightning strikes left over 6,700 people without power.

Rainfall from Hurricane Floyd affecting the state

- September 15, 1999 – Hurricane Floyd paralleled the shore of the Delmarva Peninsula as a tropical storm. Chestertown, reported a maximum rainfall total of 14 inches (350 mm), with other locales reporting similar values. Extreme river flooding causes moderate damage to bridges and roads, resulting in a damage toll of $7.9 million (1999 USD, $10 million 2008 USD) throughout the state. In addition, over 250,000 residents were without electricity because of high winds blowing down power lines. More than 28 people were forced to be rescued by boat as a result of severe flooding. Nine other people were from an apartment building near Great Mills. Two people were injured and one person was killed by carbon monoxide after losing power and running a generator inside their home. Also, a 12‑year-old boy was caught in flood waters and was swept a half mile (800 m) down a drainage ditch before being rescued and treated for hypothermia.
- October 17, 1999 – Showers from Hurricane Irene were reported, totaling to 1.29 in (33 mm) in some places.

=== 2000–2004 ===
- September 19, 2000 – The remnants of Hurricane Gordon tracked over the Delmarva Peninsula, producing up to 2.17 in (55 mm) of rainfall, mainly to the east of the center.
- June 16, 2001 – The weakening Tropical Storm Allison tracked northward along the U.S. East Coast, passing southeast of the state. Rainfall from Allison totaled to 7.5 inches (190 mm) in Denton, closing eleven roads and causing washouts on 41 others.
- September 11, 2002 – The pressure gradient between a strong high pressure system in the central United States and Hurricane Gustav located east of the state resulted in gusty winds, peaking at 44 mph (71 km/h) at Tolchester Beach. The winds damaged tree limbs and caused power outages to 3,000 customers, although it was quickly restored.
- September 16, 2002 – The remnants of Tropical Storm Hanna brought light rainfall to the Eastern Shore.
- September 27, 2002 – As the remnants of Hurricane Isidore tracked northward through the Ohio Valley, it produced light to moderate showers in northern and central Maryland.
- October 11, 2002—Remnant moisture from Hurricane Kyle produced moderate rainfall, reaching 4.03 in (102 mm) in Salisbury.

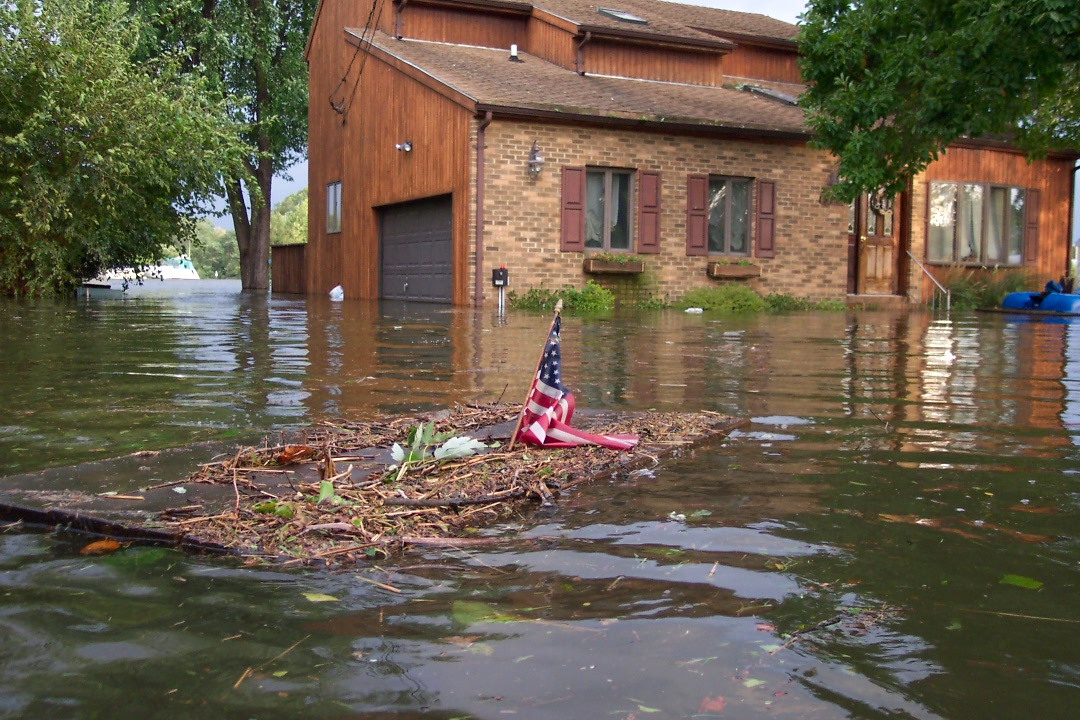
Storm surge flooding caused by Isabel in Bowleys Quarters, Maryland

- July 3, 2003 – Rainfall peaking at 4 in (100 mm) fell in association with the remnants of Tropical Storm Bill. In northern and central Dorchester County, several secondary roads were closed due to heavy rainfall and flooding.
- September 4, 2003 – The remnants of Tropical Storm Grace dropped up to 5 in (130 mm) of rain in western areas of the state, although there were no reports of damage.
- September 14, 2003 – The remnant moisture from Tropical Storm Henri produced light rainfall over the state.
- September 17, 2003 – Hurricane Isabel tracked south and west of the state, causing moderate to severe damage. Along the Eastern Shore, the hurricane produced a storm surge peaking at 8 feet (2.4 m) on the Chesapeake Bay side in Hoopers Island and 6.5 feet (2 m) on the Atlantic coast in Ocean City. The large size of Isabel caused strong winds across the area, including maximum sustained winds of 52 mph (84 km/h) and a gust of 66 mph (106 km/h) in Cambridge. Over 1.4 million people throughout the state lost electric power at some point during the storm. One death in Maryland was attributed to the hurricane, and over 200 injuries were reported. In all, damage was estimated at over $530 million (2003 USD, $621 million 2008 USD). Winds sensors in Washington, D.C. reported winds of up to 85 mph (137 km/h), which caused $125 million (2003 USD, $146 million 2008 USD) in damage.
- August 3, 2004 – Hurricane Alex's outskirts affected several portions of the state with heavy rainfall. 6.05 in (154 mm) of rainfall was reported in Assateague Island.
- August 12, 2004 – Remnant moisture from Tropical Storm Bonnie dropped light rainfall across portions of the state.
- August 14, 2004 – The weakening Tropical Storm Charley dropped rainfall across portions of the state. In Assateague Island, total rainfall was reported at 2.21 in (56 mm).
- August 30, 2004 – Hurricane Gaston tracked east of the state, producing light rainfall along the eastern shore.
- September 3, 2004 – The remnants of Hurricane Frances produced over 6 in (150 mm) of rain in some locations, although there were no reports of damage.
- September 19, 2004 – The remnants of Hurricane Ivan dropped up to 3.83 in (97 mm) of rainfall, particularly in western areas. The system also resulted in several tornadoes, one of which was reported to have killed an elderly woman and her daughter when a tree fell on their home in Cecil County.
- September 28, 2004 – The remnants of Hurricane Jeanne spawned a waterspout which moved ashore as a tornado and damaged a visitor center, tearing part of the roof off the structure and landing it on Maryland Route 2. The hurricane dropped up to 4 in (100 mm) of rainfall which resulted in widespread minor to moderate flooding. In total over 50 roads were closed due to flooding, and a group of inmates were rescued from the roof of a security van.

=== 2005–2009 ===
- July 8, 2005 – The extratropical remnants of Hurricane Cindy dropped upwards of 7 in (180 mm) in the state, and spawned one tornado. which caused sporadic tree damage. The rainfall caused flooding in some locations, leaving numerous roads underwater, and flooding several basements.
- July 9, 2005 – The remnants of Hurricane Dennis produced widespread light rainfall across much of the state.
- August 31, 2005 – The remnants of Hurricane Katrina produced light rainfall across western portions of the state. Rainfall peaked at 2.30 in (58 mm) in Thurmont.
- October 8, 2005 – A combination of the remnants of Tropical Storm Tammy and Subtropical Depression Twenty-Two contributed to the Northeast U.S. flooding of October 2005, which produced up to 9 in (230 mm) of rainfall. Dozens of roads were flooded and closed, and about 30 people were forced from their homes. Flood waters reached up to 6 ft (1.8 m) as reported by a local newspaper. Damage was estimated at $200,000 (2005 USD, $220,000 2008 USD).
- October 24, 2005 – A nor'easter fed by Hurricane Wilma brought heavy rain, wind, and snow to the state. Dozens of schools were closed and 12 inches of snow fell in western Maryland.
- June 14, 2006—The remnants of Tropical Storm Alberto dropped light rainfall in southern locations.
- September 1–2, 2006 – High winds and heavy rainfall from Hurricane Ernesto left 44,000 homes without electric power, mostly in low-lying areas of southern locations and on the eastern shore. Several basements in Anne Arundel County were forced to be pumped out due to flooding. It was estimated that wind gusts peaked at 50 mph (80 km/h).
- June 3, 2007 – Tropical Storm Barry produced light rainfall over eastern portions of the state, peaking at 2.30 in (58 mm) near Columbia.
- September 15, 2007 – The remnants of Hurricane Humberto dropped light rainfall in extreme southern locations.
- August 28, 2008 – The remnants of Tropical Storm Fay brought light rainfall to extreme western portions of the state. 2.98 in (75 mm) of rainfall was reported in Pinto.
- September 6, 2008 – Tropical Storm Hanna moved over the area from the south, dropping over four inches of rain in parts of Maryland and producing wind gusts to 50 mph (80 km/h) in Southern Maryland.
- August 29, 2009 - The remnants of Tropical Storm Danny were absorbed by a frontal boundary, causing rainfall to peak at seven inches in the state.
- November 10–14, 2009 – The remnants of Hurricane Ida contributed to the emergence of an extratropical cyclone that brought heavy rainfall and gusty winds to the state. 7.40 in (188 mm) of rain fell in Assateague Island. This storm would later be known as the November 2009 Mid-Atlantic nor'easter.

=== 2010–2014 ===
- August 30, 2010 - Hurricane Danielle passed well offshore, but swells from the hurricane killed one person and prompted the rescue of 250 others from the waters of Ocean City.
- September 3, 2010 – Hurricane Earl skimmed the coast of North Carolina and moved northeastward, resulting in heavy rain and tropical storm force winds in Southeastern Maryland, near Ocean City. Areas inland were not affected by Earl.
- September 30, 2010 – The remnants of Tropical Storm Nicole produced massive amounts of rainfall across the state. Baltimore–Washington International Airport reported 6.02 in (153 mm) of total rainfall in 24 hours. Two transit buses collided during the storm, injuring 26 people.
- August 27, 2011 – Hurricane Irene did not make direct landfall, but due to the large size, hurricane conditions were felt to the east of the Chesapeake Bay and tropical storm conditions were felt as far inland as Frederick, Maryland. Along the Delmarva Peninsula, sustained winds of 60 mph with gusts up to 85 mph and over a foot of rain fell over the area. There was also a five-foot storm surge that inundated regions around Ocean City, Maryland. The beach was evacuated prior to the storm; due to the minimal damage, it reopened the next day on Sunday and residents and tourists were allowed to return. In Central Maryland, sustained winds of 30-40 mph and 3-5 inches of rain fell. Gusts of up to 65 mph toppled many power lines. Most of the damage was from falling trees, which blocked roads, crushed power lines, and toppled onto houses. Power was out for over 200,000 people in Maryland; however, by Sunday, most power was restored.
- September 7–10, 2011 – The remnants of Tropical Storm Lee moved across Maryland, causing widespread flooding, particularly in the central portion of the state. In combination with Hurricane Irene, the National Weather Service reported rainfall totals in Prince George's County at 24.13 in (613 mm) in Largo, 23.98 in (609 mm) in Forestville, and 21.49 in (546 mm) in Forest Heights.
- May 30, 2012 – Moisture from Tropical Storm Beryl affected the state.
- September 1–3, 2012 – The remnants of Hurricane Isaac brought light rainfall to the state.
- October 29, 2012 – Hurricane Sandy made landfall north of the state. However, due to the tremendous size of the storm, its effects were felt all over Maryland. During the peak of the storm, 60 mph (97 km/h) sustained winds were felt from Frederick, Maryland eastward. However, power outages were not widespread and any problems were solved quickly due to better preparation. Heavy rain affected the state, with up to a foot of rain falling in some spots. Storm surge was also a large factor along the beaches, washing out many piers and some boardwalks along Ocean City. Hurricane Sandy is the deadliest tropical cyclone to affect the state, causing 11 deaths.
- June 7, 2013 – Rain bands from Tropical Storm Andrea caused minor flooding in the Baltimore-Washington area and parts of the Eastern Shore, with rainfall totals of just over 2 in (51 mm) in Annapolis and Baltimore-Washington International Airport, both in Anne Arundel County. Andrea was a post-tropical system by the time the center moved over St. Mary's County and the lower Eastern Shore, which was under a tornado watch at the time due to the system's history of producing tornadoes.
- October 9–12, 2013 – The remnants of Tropical Storm Karen brought heavy rainfall to the state.
- July 4, 2014 – Hurricane Arthur's outskirts brought heavy rain and wind gusts in excess of 40 mph (64 km/h) to areas such as Ocean City and Salisbury. Areas further inland were not impacted by the storm.
- August 28, 2014 – Hurricane Cristobal passed offshore, killing a swimmer in Ocean City. The Coast Guard also rescued three people after their 17-foot boat overturned.
- September 17, 2014 – Hurricane Edouard passed well offshore, but strong rip currents resulted in two deaths off the coast of Ocean City.

=== 2015–2019 ===
- May 11, 2015 – Tropical Storm Ana skimmed the Eastern Shore and brought gentle light rainfall to the area.
- June 20, 2015 – The remnants of Tropical Storm Bill brought heavy rainfall, thunderstorms, and gusty winds to the state. A tornado touched down in Tuscarora, but caused no damage.
- October 28, 2015 – The remnants of Hurricane Patricia brought rainfall to western portions of the state.
- May 29–30, 2016 – Tropical moisture from Tropical Storm Bonnie brought widespread rainfall across the state.
- September 3, 2016 – Tropical Storm Hermine affected the majority of the Eastern Shore with heavy rainfall and high winds, prompting tropical storm warnings to be put up. Governor Larry Hogan also declared a state of emergency for several counties along the Eastern Shore. Winds gusted well over 40 mph (64 km/h) in Ocean City, Maryland.
- September 19–22, 2016 – A combination of the remnants of Tropical Storm Julia and a cold front brought rainfall to the state.
- October 8–9, 2016 – While Hurricane Matthew did not make landfall in the state, the storm still brought rain and gusty winds to the state due to its large size. A maximum rainfall total of 5.52 in (140 mm) was reported in Berlin. A wind gust of 49 mph (79 km/h) was reported in Ocean City as well.
- June 23–24, 2017 – The remnants of Tropical Storm Cindy brought rainfall to the entire state.
- September 2, 2017 – The remnants of Hurricane Harvey brought heavy rain, thunderstorms and gusty winds to the state.
- September 12–14, 2017 – The remnants of Hurricane Irma affected portions of the state.
- September 19, 2017 – Hurricane Jose passed offshore, which brought showers, gusty winds and high rip currents to the Eastern Shore. The storm brought heavy winds and rain to Ocean City, Maryland on September 19, with large waves and strong currents flooding a parking lot at the Ocean City Inlet.
- October 8, 2017 – The remnants of Hurricane Nate affected the state.
- October 29, 2017 – Tropical Storm Philippe was absorbed by a non-tropical area of low pressure, which brought heavy rainfall and high winds to the state. Snow also fell in extreme western portions.
- September 8, 2018 – The remnants of Tropical Storm Gordon were absorbed by a large front. The new system brought rainfall on the state for several days.
- September 14, 2018 – Hurricane Florence tracked south of the state, with its outer bands bringing rain and gusty winds to the state. Large swells ahead of the hurricane reached Assateague State Park, Maryland, by September 9, prompting the Maryland Department of Natural Resources to close beach access indefinitely.
- October 11–12, 2018 – Tropical Storm Michael tracked inland, bringing heavy rainfall and gusty winds to the state.
- October 26–27, 2018 – The remnants of Hurricane Willa brought rainfall and gusty winds to much of the state.
- July 17, 2019 – The remnants of Hurricane Barry affected the state.
- September 6, 2019 – Hurricane Dorian tracked southeast of the state, bringing heavy rainfall and high winds to the Eastern Shore in particular. Tropical Storm Warnings were put in place.
- October 11, 2019 – Tropical Storm Melissa brought widespread flooding to the state. Flooding from increased high tides from the storm forced street closures in Crisfield and Salisbury.
- October 20, 2019 – The remnants of Tropical Storm Nestor brought heavy rain and high winds to the state.

=== 2020–2024 ===
- May 18, 2020 – Tropical Storm Arthur brought rainfall to the Eastern Shore as it passed off the coast.
- July 10, 2020 – Tropical Storm Fay impacted the state with heavy rainfall and wind.
- August 4, 2020 – Hurricane Isaias tracked through the state as a tropical storm, spawning several tornadoes, high winds, heavy rainfall and thunderstorms. One person died while driving when a tree fell on their vehicle in St. Mary's County.
- August 29, 2020 – The remnants of Hurricane Laura moved across the state.
- September 17, 2020 – The remnants of Hurricane Sally brought rainfall to the state.
- October 11, 2020 – The remnants of Hurricane Delta affected the state with rainfall.
- October 29, 2020 – Hurricane Zeta tracked inland as a tropical storm, bringing heavy rainfall and windy conditions to the state.
- November 12, 2020 – The remnants of Hurricane Eta affected the state with massive flooding.
- June 21, 2021 – The remnants of Tropical Storm Claudette brought showers to extreme southern portions of the state.
- July 8–9, 2021 – Tropical Storm Elsa tracked inland, bringing heavy rain and winds to the state.
- August 17–18, 2021 – The remnants of Tropical Storm Fred affected the state.
- August 21, 2021 – The far outskirts of Hurricane Henri affected the Eastern Shore with rain and thunderstorms as it passed well offshore.
- September 1, 2021 – The remnants of Hurricane Ida brought heavy thunderstorms to the state. A tornado touched down in Hurlock. One man died in Rockville due to flooding.
- September 30, 2022 - The remnants of Hurricane Ian brought a storm surge, riptide and 40+ mph winds to Ocean City. The three day Oceans Calling Music Festival scheduled at the inlet was canceled as a result.
- November 11, 2022 - The remnants of Hurricane Nicole affect the state.
- September 22–24, 2023 – Tropical Storm Ophelia affected the entire state with heavy rain and high winds.
- August 8-9, 2024 – The remnants of Hurricane Debby affected the state.
- September 27, 2024 – The remnants of Hurricane Helene affected the state.

=== 2025–present ===
- July 8, 2025 – The remnants of Tropical Storm Chantal affected the state. Strong wind gusts from thunderstorms from Chantal's remnants had peak gusts reaching 70 miles per hour (110 km/h) in Kingstown. More than 18,000 customers were affected by power outages across the state. A game between the Baltimore Orioles and New York Mets at Camden Yards was delayed because of the storms.
- August 21, 2025 – Hurricane Erin passed offshore, bringing rainfall and high winds to the state. Dangerous rip currents and flooding were present in Ocean City.
- October 11, 2026 – The remnants of Hurricane Isaias overspread Maryland over the weekend, leaving as much as 4–5 inches (100–130 mm) of rainfall in areas from Frederick County to Annapolis.

== Climatological statistics ==
Number of recorded storms affecting Maryland and Washington, D.C. 1980 to present
Month	Number of storms
May	4
June	12
July	15
August	31
September	57
October	28
November	4

Storms affecting Maryland by period
Period	Number of storms
1950s	9
1960s	14
1970s	11
1980s	13
1990s	20
2000s	30
2010s	34
2020s	21

== Deadly storms ==
The following table includes all storms since 1950 that have caused reported fatalities in Maryland and Washington, D.C.

Total deaths
Name	Year	Number of deaths
Hurricane Agnes	1972	19
Hurricane Connie	1955	14
Hurricane Sandy	2012	11
Hurricane Isabel	2003	7
Hurricane Hazel	1954	6
Hurricane Donna	1960	2
Hurricane Ivan	2004	2
Hurricane Edouard	2014	2
Hurricane Ida	2021	2
Hurricane Fran	1996	1
Hurricane Floyd	1999	1
Hurricane Danielle	2010	1
Hurricane Irene	2011	1
Hurricane Cristobal	2014	1
Hurricane Isaias	2020	1
