= Gustav of Sweden =

Gustav of Sweden - English (actually Latin) also: Gustavus; Swedish (legal spellings after 1900): Gustaf - may refer to:

- Gustav Vasa, Gustav I, King of Sweden 1523-1560
- Gustavus Adolphus, Gustav II Adolph, King of Sweden 1611-1632
- Gustav III, King of Sweden 1771-1792
- Gustav IV Adolf, King of Sweden 1792-1809
- Gustaf V, King of Sweden 1907-1950
- Gustaf VI Adolf, King of Sweden 1950-1973
- Prince Gustav of Sweden, Prince of Sweden 1568
- Gustav, Prince of Sweden 1587, son of King Charles IX of Sweden (died in infancy)
- Gustav Adolph, Prince of Sweden de facto 1652, son of Prince Adolph John I, Count Palatine of Kleeburg (died in infancy)
- Gustav, Prince of Sweden 1683, son of King Charles XI of Sweden (died in infancy)
- Gustav, Prince of Vasa, Crown Prince of Sweden 1799
- Prince Gustaf, Duke of Uppland, Prince of Sweden 1827
- Prince Gustaf Adolf, Duke of Västerbotten, Prince of Sweden 1906

== See also ==
- Gustaf of Sweden (disambiguation)
- Carl Gustav of Sweden (disambiguation)
