= Emīlija Gudriniece =

Latvian chemist

- Born: Emīlija Julianovna Gudriniece; 3 August 1920; Rēzekne district, Latvia
- Died: 4 October 2004 (aged 84); Riga, Latvia
- Other name: Эмилия Юлиановна Гудриниеце
- Education: University of Latvia
- Occupation: Chemist
- Years active: 1949–2000
- Known for: Initiating rapeseed oil tests as biofuel

Emīlija Gudriniece (Russian: Эмилия Юлиановна Гудриниеце; 3 August 1920 – 4 October 2004) was a Soviet and Latvian chemist who specialized in organic synthesis. She focused on the practical use of substances and synthesized furacilin, for which she won a state prize. She was one of the first to recognize the potential of using vegetable oils as biofuels and initiated the study of rapeseed oil refining in Latvia. She was a prolific publisher, edited the Latvian Journal of Chemistry, and published a Latvian language textbook on organic synthesis methods. She was awarded multiple prizes and recognition for her work.

== Biography ==
Gudriniece was born on 3 August 1920, in the Rēzekne district of Latvia. She grew up in the farming village of Kromoni in the Kaunata Parish and then went on to graduate from the University of Latvia in 1948 with a degree in chemical engineering. Gudriniece began her graduate work in 1949, finishing with her Candidacy Degree in Chemical Science (Note: The Soviet degree, Candidate of Science, was the equivalent of the Western PhD) in 1952. During this same time frame, she won the Latvian Women's Motorcycling Championship twice, both in 1949 and 1953. She was hired as an associate professor that year at the University of Latvia in the Chemistry Faculty, where she remained until 1958. In 1959, she moved to the chemical technology department of the Riga Polytechnical Institute to begin her studies for her habilitation degree, which was completed from the Nesmeyanov Institute of Organoelement Compounds of Moscow in 1960. Following her completion of the advanced degree, Gudriniece was made a professor at the Riga Polytechnic in 1961. She founded the Department of Organic Synthesis and Biotechnology in 1963 at the Polytechnic and headed the department for the next 27 years.

Gudriniece's basic research focused on organic synthesis and the practical use of substances for medicines, cosmetics, and industry. She synthesized furacilin and developed a method of utilizing it for industrial purposes, which earned her the Latvian Soviet Socialist Republic Prize in 1957. She studied chloromethylated nitration, sulfonation, and the reactivity of cyclic 1,3-diketones, publishing over 600 scientific reports on theoretical and synthetic chemistry of heterocyclic and 1,3-dicarbonyl compounds. Her most recent work focused on studies of rapeseed oil in attempts to develop techniques for the separation of lipids and refining of rapeseed oil as an industry in Latvia. She was one of the first to recognize the application of vegetable oils for biofuels. She also served on the editorial board of the Latvian Journal of Chemistry and at the time of her death was coauthor of the only textbook in the Latvian language on organic synthesis methods. Gudriniece received many honors, including the Gustavs Vanags Prize for Chemistry in 1972, the Vladimir Vasilevich Chelintsev Memorial Medal, election as an academician in the Latvian Academy of Sciences in 1978, Latvian Emeritus State Scientist in 1996, professor emeritus from the Riga Technical University in 2000, the Paul Walden Medal in 2000, and the Grindeks Award for her contributions to education in 2003.

Gudriniece died on 4 October 2004, in Riga, Latvia.

== Selected works ==
- Gudriniece, E.; Strakov, A.; Strakova, I. (1988). "Syntheses of heterocyclic compounds on basis 1,3-cyclohexanediones". Химия Гетероциклических Соединений (in Russian) (6): 723–738.
- Gudriniece, E.; Belyakov, S.; Jure, M. (1991). "Structure of 3-aminocarbonyl-2-(N-benzylamino)-6-phenyl-4-trifluoromethylpyridine". Acta Crystallogr. 47: 344–345.
- Gudriniece, E.; Palitis, E.; Barkane, V. (1992). "Heterocyclic compounds on diketone basis. XXXII. Synthesis of thieno[2,3-d]pyrimidones on basis of 2-amino-3-cyanothiophenes". Latvian Journal of Chemistry (in Russian): 356–360.
- Gudriniece, E.; Dambeniece, I.; Karklina, A.; et al. (1993). "Reactions of 4-ureido-2-buten-4-olides with amines". Latvian Journal of Chemistry (in Russian): 338–343.
- Gudriniece, E.; Dambeniece, I.; Karklina, A.; et al. (1993). "Reactions of 4-ureido-2-buten-4-olides with amines". Latvian Journal of Chemistry (in Russian): 338–343.
- Gudriniece, E.; Serzane, R.; Strele, M. (2000). "Investigations of Oils and Fats". Material Science and Applied Chemistry (1): 92.
- Gudriniece, E.; Starmkale, V.; Serzane, R.; et al. (2001). "Investigations of oils from plants growing in Latvia". Scientific Conference 'Organic Chemistry': 50.
- Suloyeva, E.; Jure, E.; Gudriniece, S., et, al (2001). "Synthesis of 2,3-dihydro-7-trifluoromethyl-5-phenylimidazo[1,2-a]pyridines". Химия Гетероциклических Соединений (in Russian) (3): 358.
- Suloyeva, E.; Jure, E.; Gudriniece, E., et, al (2002). "Properties of 8-cyano-2,3-dihydro-5-phenyl-7- trifluoromethylimidazo[1,2-a]pyridines". Химия Гетероциклических Соединений (in Russian) (68): 811–822.
- Ravina, I.; Zicane, D.; Gudriniece, E., et, al (2002). "Exotic amino acids. 6. Synthesis of substituted 4-oxo-4H-pyrido[1,2-a]pyrimidines". Химия Гетероциклических Соединений (in Russian) (7): 945.
