= Gustaf of Sweden =

Gustaf of Sweden (in English normally Gustav) is the legal and official spelling (in Swedish) of three twentieth century members of the Swedish Royal Family:

- Gustaf V, King of Sweden 1907-1950 (1858-1950)
- Gustaf VI Adolf, King of Sweden 1950-1973 (1882-1973)
- Prince Gustaf Adolf, Duke of Västerbotten, Prince of Sweden (1906-1947)

== See also ==
- Gustav of Sweden (disambiguation)
