= Gustavs (name) =

- Gender: Male

Origin
- Region of origin: Latvia

Other names
- Related names: Gustav, Gustaf

Gustavs is a Latvian masculine given name and may refer to:

- Gustavs "Gustavo" Butelis (born 1978), Latvian rapper and record producer
- Gustavs Celmiņš (1899-1968), a Latvian politician
- Gustavs Ērenpreis (1891–1956), Latvian bicycle manufacturer
- Gustav Klutsis (1895-1938), Latvian photographer
- Gustavs Šķilters (1874–1954), Latvian sculptor
- Gustavs Tūrs (1890–1973), Latvian prelate of the Evangelical Lutheran Church of Latvia and Archbishop of Riga
- Gustavs Vanags (1891—1965), Latvian organic chemist
- Gustavs Zemgals (1871–1939), Latvian politician and the second President of Latvia
