= Hurricane Eloise =

Category 3 Atlantic hurricane in 1975

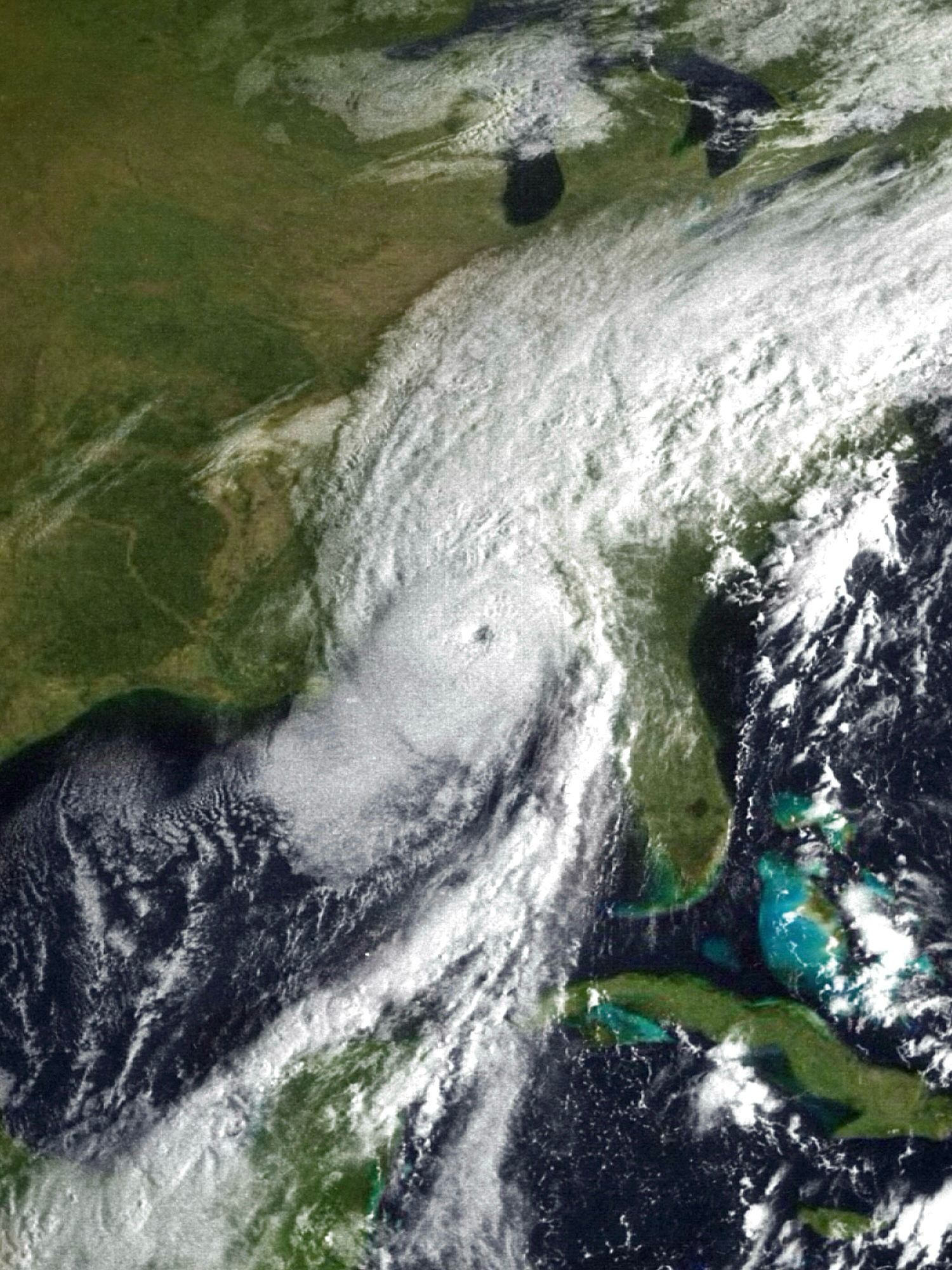
- Eloise making landfall in Florida at peak intensity on September 23

Meteorological history
- Formed: September 13, 1975
- Dissipated: September 24, 1975

Category 3 major hurricane
- 1-minute sustained (SSHWS/NWS)
- Highest winds: 125 mph (205 km/h)
- Lowest pressure: 950 mbar (hPa); 28.05 inHg

Overall effects
- Fatalities: 80 direct
- Damage: $560 million (1975 USD)
- Areas affected: Lesser Antilles, Greater Antilles, Yucatán Peninsula, Florida, Eastern United States
- IBTrACS
- Part of the 1975 Atlantic hurricane season

Hurricane Eloise was the most destructive tropical cyclone of the 1975 Atlantic hurricane season. The fifth tropical storm, fourth hurricane, and second major hurricane of the season, Eloise formed as a tropical depression on September 13 to the east of the Virgin Islands. The depression tracked westward and intensified into a tropical storm while passing to the north of Puerto Rico. Eloise briefly attained hurricane intensity soon thereafter, but weakened back to a tropical storm upon making landfall over Hispaniola. A weak and disorganized cyclone, Eloise emerged into open waters of the northern Caribbean Sea; upon striking the northern Yucatan Peninsula, it turned north and began to re-intensify. In the Gulf of Mexico, the cyclone quickly matured and became a Category 3 hurricane on September 23. Eloise made landfall along the Florida Panhandle west of Panama City before moving inland across Alabama and dissipating on September 24.

The storm produced torrential rainfall throughout the islands of Puerto Rico and Hispaniola, causing extensive flooding that led to severe damage and more than 40 deaths. Thousands of people in these areas became homeless as flood waters submerged numerous communities. As Eloise progressed westward, it affected Cuba to a lesser extent. In advance of the storm, about 100,000 residents evacuated from the Gulf Coast region. Upon making landfall in Florida, Eloise generated wind gusts of 155 miles per hour (249 km/h), which demolished hundreds of buildings in the area. The storm's severe winds, waves, and storm surge left numerous beaches, piers, and other coastal structures heavily impaired.

Wind-related damage extended into inland Alabama and Georgia. Further north, torrential rains along the entire East Coast of the United States created an unprecedented and far-reaching flooding event, especially into the Mid-Atlantic States. In that region, an additional 17 people died as a result of freshwater flooding from the post-tropical storm; infrastructural and geological effects were comparable to those from Hurricane Agnes several years prior. Across the United States, damage amounted to approximately $560 million. The storm killed 80 people along its entire track; due to the severe damage, the name Eloise was retired from the Atlantic tropical cyclone naming lists.

== Meteorological history ==
Map plotting the storm's track and intensity, according to the Saffir–Simpson scale Map key Saffir–Simpson scale Tropical depression (≤38 mph, ≤62 km/h) Tropical storm (39–73 mph, 63–118 km/h) Category 1 (74–95 mph, 119–153 km/h) Category 2 (96–110 mph, 154–177 km/h) Category 3 (111–129 mph, 178–208 km/h) Category 4 (130–156 mph, 209–251 km/h) Category 5 (≥157 mph, ≥252 km/h) Unknown Storm type Tropical cyclone Subtropical cyclone Extratropical cyclone, remnant low, tropical disturbance, or monsoon depression

The origins of Hurricane Eloise trace back to a tropical wave that emerged from the western coast of Africa on September 6, 1975. Satellite imagery indicated that the system was initially disjointed and poorly developed, although there was evidence of a low-level circulation. The disturbance tracked westward for several days as it slowly matured. On September 13, a ship called the Gulf Hansa recorded winds of around 25 mph (40 km/h) and 10 feet (3.0 m) seas in association with the system. Shortly thereafter, a reconnaissance aircraft found a center of circulation 575 miles (925 km) east of the Virgin Islands, and it is estimated that the storm became a tropical depression at 0600 UTC.

The depression continued moving towards the west as it gradually strengthened. On September 16, the system attained tropical storm status and was designated Eloise; accordingly, the first advisory on the system was issued by the San Juan Weather Bureau office. While in the vicinity of a strengthening anticyclone aloft, Eloise became better organized, and the storm rapidly intensified and reached Category 1 hurricane status 18 hours after being named. The cyclone soon made landfall on the Dominican Republic, inhibiting further development. Although initially predicted to remain north of land, the storm moved across northern Hispaniola and then tracked across southeastern Cuba. After 36 hours with much of its circulation over mountainous terrain, Eloise deteriorated to a tropical storm on September 17.

The cyclone emerged over the open waters of the northern Caribbean on September 19, passing Jamaica to the north as it moved away from Cuba. Despite favorable upper-level conditions, its interaction with land—combined with the weakening of a ridge to the north—left the storm's center distorted. Eloise remained a fairly disorganized tropical storm until September 20, when it approached the Yucatan Peninsula and began to re-intensify. The storm crossed over the northern tip of the peninsula as it began to turn northward in response to an approaching trough. Between September 17 and September 21, however, reports on the storm were scarce, leading to uncertainty in its exact location and strength. Upon entering the Gulf of Mexico, Eloise quickly organized. The trough enhanced the wind divergence over the storm's center, allowing it to strengthen once again to reach hurricane force about 345 miles (555 km) south of New Orleans, Louisiana.

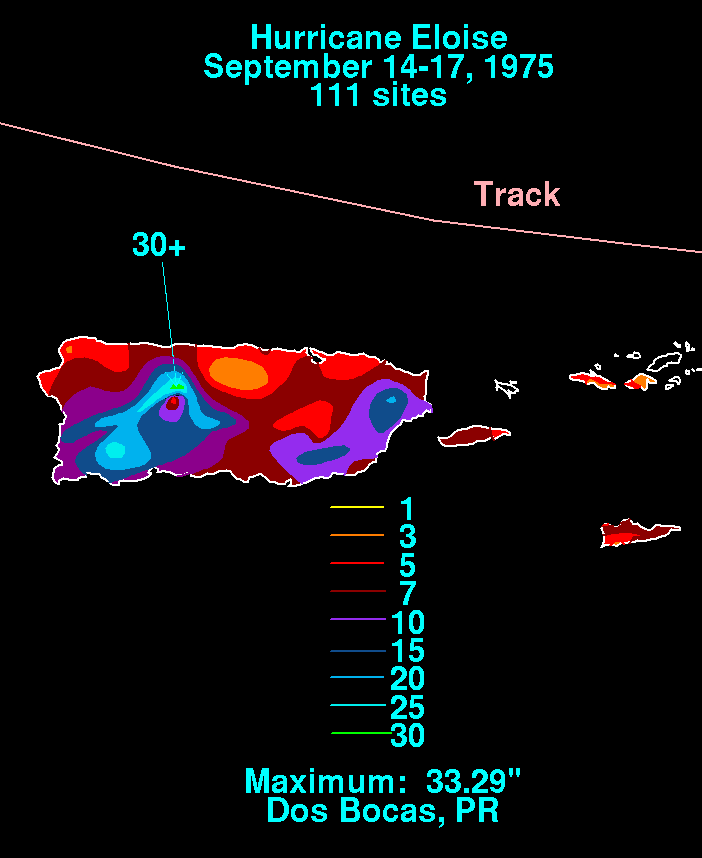
Rainfall totals in Puerto Rico and the U.S. Virgin Islands

On September 22, the cyclone intensified to attain Category 2 strength, and became a major hurricane of Category 3 status shortly thereafter as it turned towards the northeast. Several ships penetrated the storm's center during its passage through the gulf. The hurricane also moved over two experimental buoys which recorded data on the storm, aiding meteorologists in their forecasts. Hurricane Eloise continued to strengthen until it reached its peak winds of 125 mph (205 km/h) and a minimum barometric pressure of about 955 mbar (hPa; 28.2 inHg). It moved ashore along the Florida Panhandle near Panama City on September 23. Shortly after making landfall, the hurricane rapidly degenerated. Just six hours later, it had weakened into a tropical storm, while situated over eastern Alabama. It further weakened into a tropical depression at 0000 UTC on September 24. The depression transitioned into an extratropical storm over Virginia, and became indistinguishable by later that same day. The remnant moisture, however, merged with a weather front to produce widespread and heavy precipitation.

== Preparations ==
In advance of Hurricane Eloise, warnings for heavy rainfall and potential flooding were issued for Puerto Rico and the Virgin Islands. A hurricane warning was declared for parts of the Dominican Republic about 12 hours before landfall. A "hurricane emergency" was put into effect for the Oriente Province of Cuba, while a "state of alert" was issued for the Camagüey Province. Cubana de Aviación suspended all flights to Oriente.

On and before September 15, there was still uncertainty as to whether Eloise would impact the United States. However, officials in Florida began taking precautionary measures. When the storm entered the Gulf of Mexico, forecasters suggested that the storm would continue northward and strike the area near Mobile Bay. Contrary to predictions, by late on September 22, the storm had turned northeast, and some residents of Florida were still unaware of the storm's threat despite the issuance of hurricane warnings 24 hours in advance. As a result, evacuations were delayed to an extent. During the morning hours of September 23, civil preparedness workers drove through coastal towns with loudspeakers advising people to seek shelter. Due to the intensity of the approaching hurricane, evacuations along the coast were ultimately thorough, despite the initial delay. It was reported that 99% of Pensacola residents along the beach had left their homes, and overall, 100,000 people evacuated from areas in Louisiana through Florida.

A statement issued by the National Weather Service advised people in nine Florida counties to complete hurricane preparations, which included securing loose objects and moving watercraft to safety. Homes along the coast were boarded up by their owners, while offshore, workers were removed from oil platforms. A spokesman for Royal Dutch Shell reported that 800 workers were to be evacuated. In New Orleans, emergency equipment was readied and inspected. The New Orleans Levee Board went into a second-stage alert on September 21, and cleared debris from floodwall openings.

== Impact ==
=== Caribbean Sea ===
Storm deaths by region
Region	Direct deaths
Puerto Rico	34
Dominican Republic	7
Haiti	18
Florida	4
United States, elsewhere	17
Total	80

As a weak tropical depression, the storm brought 5 to 10 inches (130 to 250 mm) of rainfall to portions of the Leeward Islands, including St. Kitts and St. Martin. More minor amounts of precipitation fell over the northernmost islands, and winds were light in these areas.

Despite being only a tropical storm while passing by Puerto Rico, Eloise produced extreme amounts of rainfall on the island, peaking at 33.29 inches (846 mm) in Dos Bocas. Other totals of 10 to 20 inches (250 to 510 mm) were common. The heavy rains resulted in severe flash flooding which killed 34 people, mostly from drownings, and left $60 million in damages. Several hundred people were injured, and the storm forced over 6,000 residents from their homes. Dozens of towns and villages were flooded, though Utuado, with a population of 35,000 at the time, was hit the hardest. The situation in that town was described as a "total disaster"; four housing developments were under water, and dozens of vehicles were washed away. The flood waters submerged thousands of miles of roads and put several bridges out-of-service.

As the storm proceeded westward, it dropped heavy rainfall throughout eastern and southern Hispaniola. Widespread flooding impacted Haiti and the Dominican Republic, leaving a total of 25 people dead. Although the most intense winds remained offshore, a gust of 50 miles per hour (80 km/h) was recorded at Cape Engaño. Puerto Plata on the northern coast of the Dominican Republic was also battered by high winds and heavy rain. Following the storm, electricity was turned off due to the danger of electrocutions. Despite the storm's effects across Hispaniola and Puerto Rico, no monetary damage totals are available.

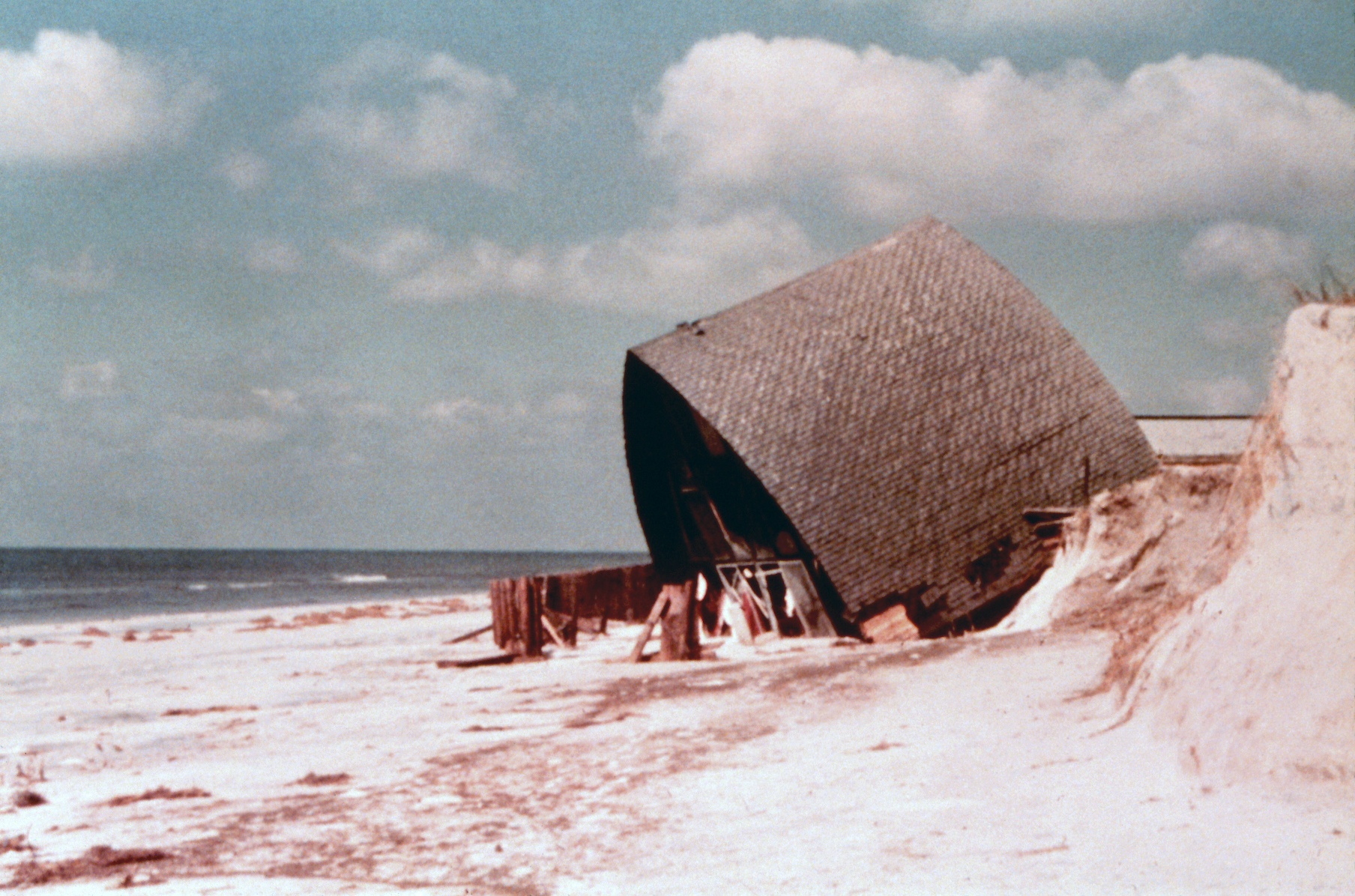
A beach house demolished by the hurricane

Rain and wind from the storm affected the southern Bahamas, Cuba, Jamaica, the Cayman Islands, and the northern Yucatan Peninsula. Since the storm was primarily weak while passing by these areas, no significant damage was reported. Eloise brought torrential rainfall and winds of 20 mph (32 km/h) to the Guantanamo Bay Naval Base in southeastern Cuba, inflicting $65,000 in damage. Personnel on the base were moved to designated hurricane shelters in advance of the storm.

=== Florida ===
Eloise came ashore along the coast of northern Florida as a Category 3 storm producing winds of 90 mph (140 km/h) with gusts that reached 155 mph (249 km/h). Sustained winds were likely higher, but due to the sparsity of recording stations, few official records exist. The winds in the area were reportedly the strongest of the century. Hurricane-force winds occurred from Fort Walton Beach through Panama City. Along the coast, tides ran 12 to 16 feet (3.7 to 4.9 m) above normal, peaking at 18 feet (5.5 m). Hurricane Eloise spawned several tornadoes as it pressed inland. In general, rainfall ranged from 4 to 8 inches (100 to 200 mm); at the Eglin Air Force Base near Valparaiso, however, the hurricane dropped 14.9 inches (380 mm) of precipitation. The heaviest rainfall was usually confined to northwest of the storm's track, and a number of locations to the east of Eloise's center picked up less than 1 inch (25 mm) of rain.

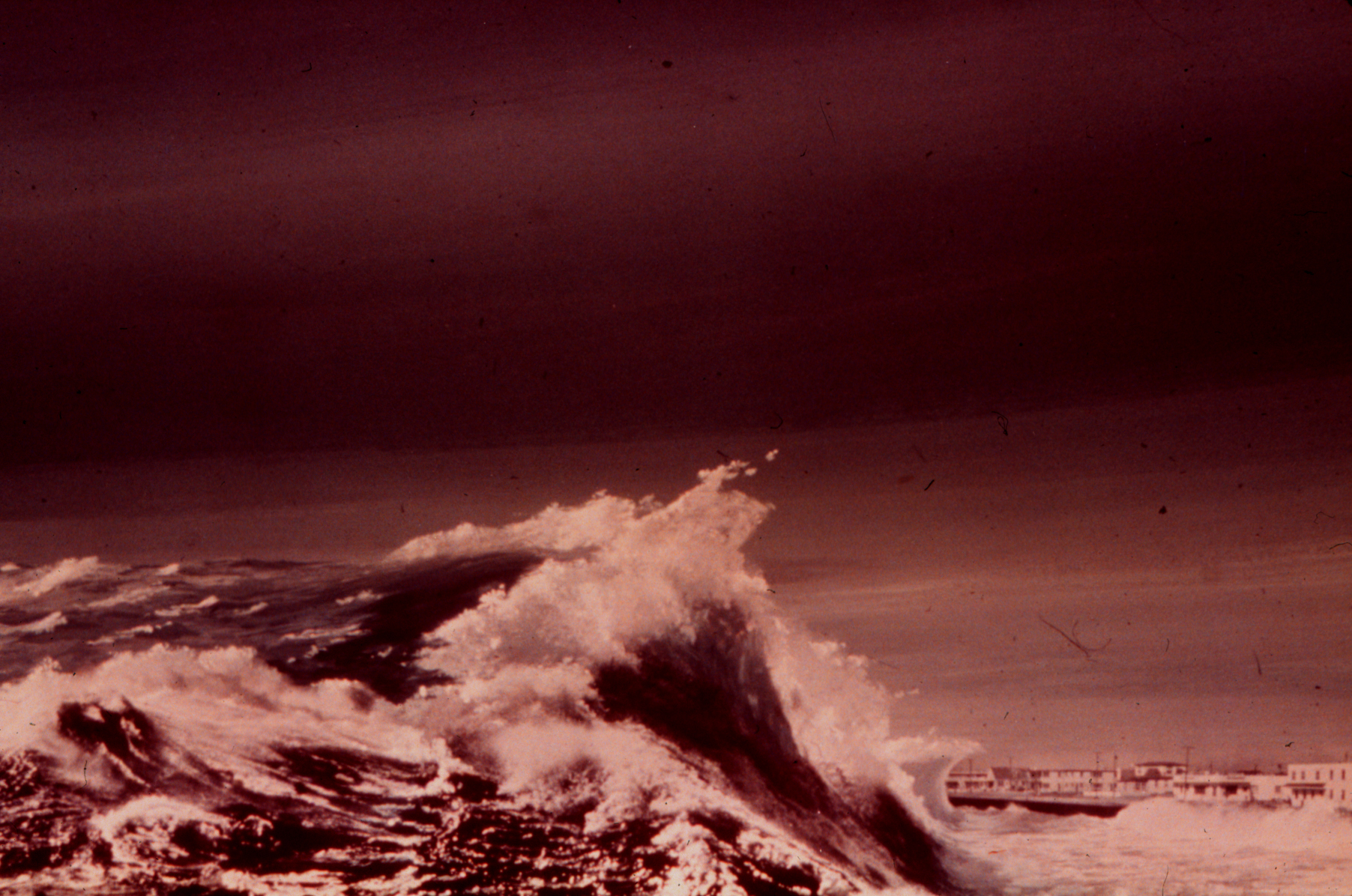
Storm surge during Hurricane Eloise.

Damage from the hurricane was widespread. Fort Walton Beach, where hundreds of structures were damaged or destroyed, was hit particularly hard. In some areas, the storm surge washed away buildings demolished by the strong winds. The winds cleared certain locations of trees and buried properties and roads under sand. Throughout northwest Florida, an estimated 8,000 people suffered storm-related losses, and 500 businesses were completely destroyed. An article in the Tallahassee Democrat reported that "Cottages, motels, restaurants, convenience stores and other beach businesses were strewn across the highway in a tangle of down power poles, lines and busted mains." A 2,100-acre (850 ha) shrimp farm at Panama City, the first of its kind, was effectively lost. The storm destroyed the farm's prospective initial harvest, 1,500,000 pounds (680,000 kg) of shrimp enclosed in a system of nets and enclosures. The president of the company described the subsequent events as six months of extreme turmoil in an effort to recover, followed by a quick and steady rebound. By the spring of 1976, the company became confident in financial success and full recovery.

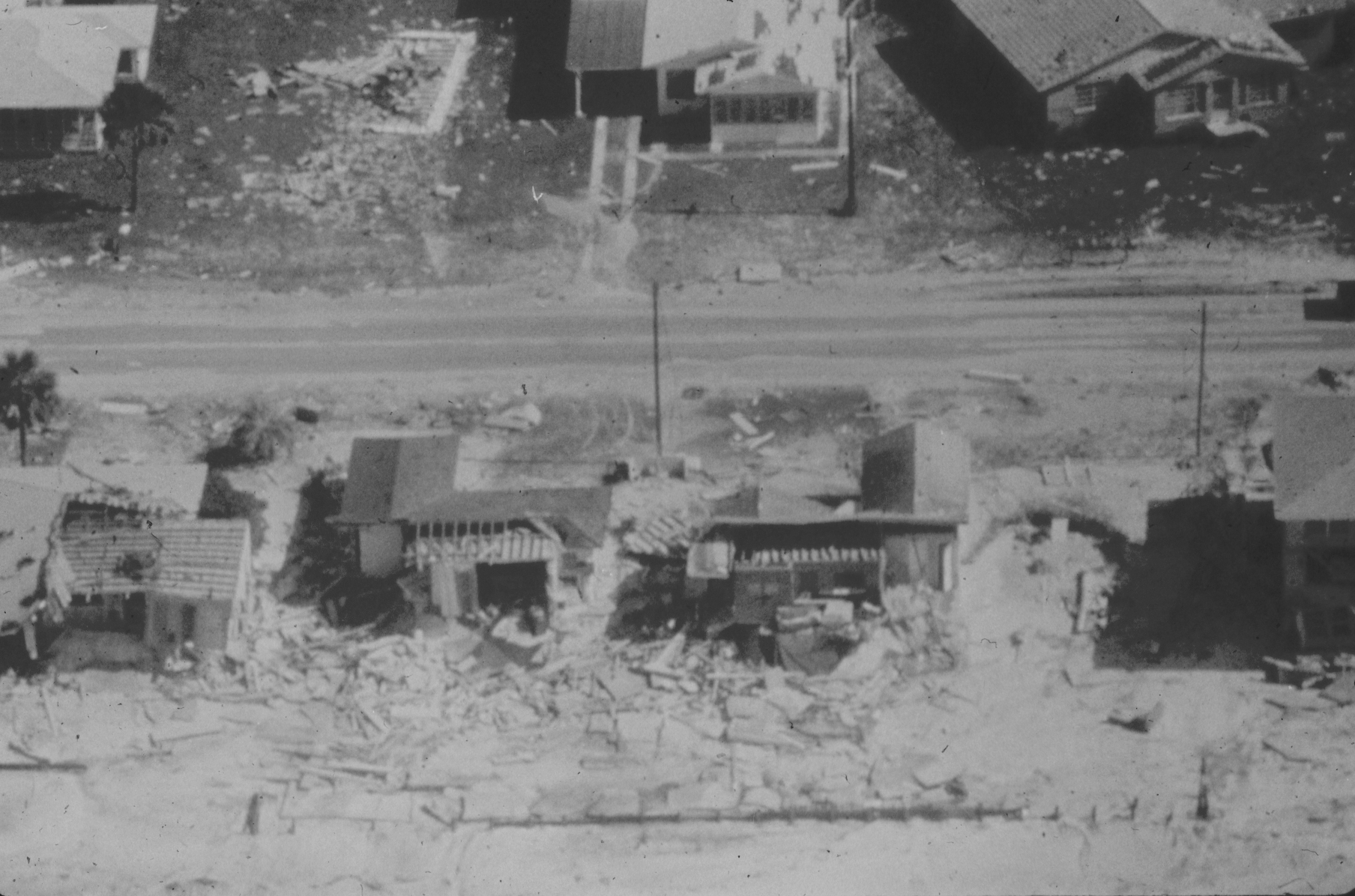
Aerial view of the Florida Panhandle damage

The storm caused severe beach erosion in Bay County; approximately 801,000 cubic yards (612,000 m^{3}) of sand was removed. Storm-related changes in the coastal topography resulted in extensive structural damage in the Panama City Beach area. The most severe damage was concentrated in a 22 miles (35 km) area of the shore east of the hurricane's eye, and storm surge peaked in intensity for no more than a half hour according to preliminary estimates. Much of the resultant damage came as a result of foundation undermining, which was compared to that of the New England hurricane of 1938. Although Eloise was not abnormally strong, the geographical setting and building standards in the area were blamed for the destruction of many homes and businesses. Monetary losses from property damage in Panama City Beach alone totaled about $50 million.

The first major storm to strike the region in 40 years, Hurricane Eloise did not directly kill anyone in the state of Florida. However, four deaths of an indirect nature were attributed to the hurricane; two of them were related to heart attacks. Numerous people sustained injuries, largely from broken glass or cleanup efforts. Overall property damage from the storm in Florida amounted to $150 million. In the storm's aftermath, a study of the hurricane's effect on aquatic animals living in the swash zone (the immediate area where land and the ocean meet) of Panama City Beach was conducted. The study concluded that compared to 11 consecutive months of data prior to the storm, the swash zone experienced a brief influx of animal species normally found offshore. However, the number decreased to near normal shortly thereafter. Also along the shore, the hurricane dismantled or severely impaired several piers, including the total destruction of a 300 feet (91 m) extension of the Okaloosa Island Pier built just three years earlier and part of its original span. A fishing pier at St. Andrews State Park also suffered vast damage, along with another wooden pier at Mexico Beach and the M.B. Miller Pier at Panama City Beach, which lost its end section to the storm.

=== Elsewhere in the United States ===
As the hurricane progressed inland, it passed over eastern Alabama, generating strong winds. A gust of 100 mph (160 km/h) was recorded northeast of Ozark. Winds elsewhere in the state ranged from around 35 mph (56 km/h) to 88 mph (142 km/h). Precipitation in Alabama peaked at 5.54 inches (141 mm). The high winds resulted in severe damage to property and crops, amounting to $100 million. Eloise cut power and telephone service in the area, and in Geneva County, several people sustained storm-related injuries. As in Florida, the weakening hurricane spawned a number of tornadoes in Alabama and Georgia. Preliminary reports indicated that every county in southeastern Alabama received some damage from the storm. The strong winds uprooted trees and knocked down powerlines. Heavy rain associated with the storm caused a leak in the Alabama State Capitol building roof. Gusty winds, moderate to heavy rainfall, and low pressures extended into Georgia, Louisiana, and to a lesser extent, Mississippi.

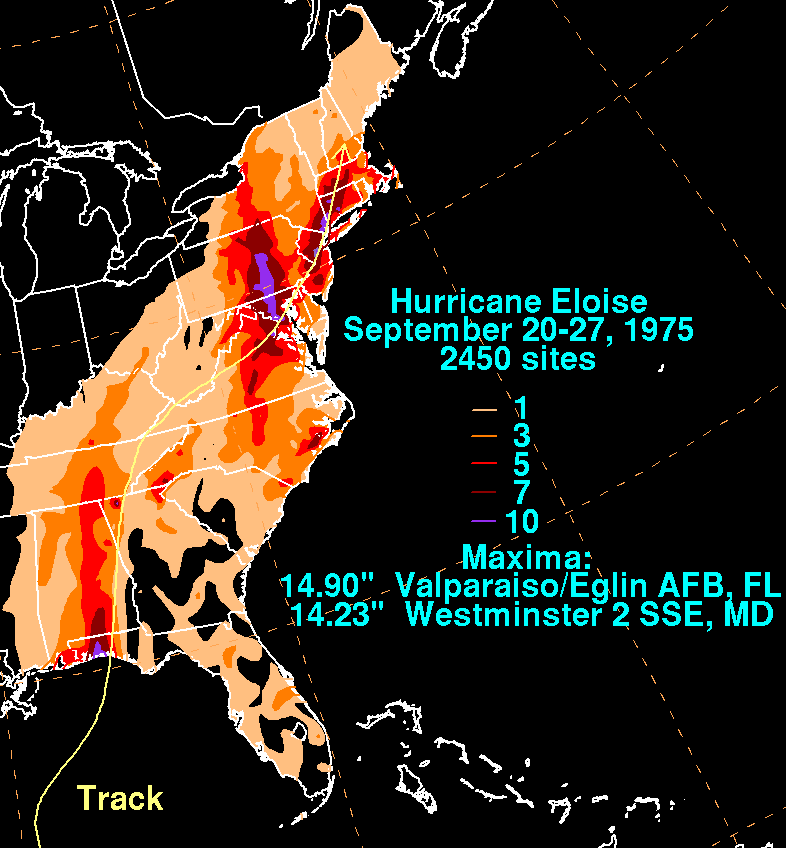
Rainfall totals from Eloise in the United States

The remnants of Eloise interacted with another weather system, producing widespread precipitation across the Eastern United States, including portions of the Ohio Valley, the Mid-Atlantic states, and New England. The deluge was "almost continuous" during the period between September 22 and 26 according to a statement by the National Weather Service. One of the highest rainfall totals in association with the storm occurred in Westminster, Maryland, where 14.23 inches (361 mm) of rain were recorded. Elsewhere, 7 to 10 inches (180 to 250 mm) or more of precipitation fell throughout parts of Pennsylvania, New Jersey, New York and Connecticut. At least 22 states received rainfall from Hurricane Eloise and its remnant moisture. Nearby Hurricane Faye may have also contributed to the heavy rainfall, although this connection was never confirmed. In Washington, D.C., 9.08 inches (231 mm) of rain contributed to the wettest September on record since 1934. The excessive rainfall led to extensive flooding throughout the region, in some areas exceeding 50- to 100-year levels.

Pennsylvania and New York bore the brunt of the flooding, which culminated in loss of life and severe property damage. Along the central Southern Tier region of New York, the storm damaged or destroyed over 700 structures. Flooding throughout the Northeastern United States disabled over a dozen water plants and at least 16 sewage treatment plants, prompting a boil-water advisory in Pennsylvania's capital city of Harrisburg. Infrastructure further south also suffered; in Maryland, the Monocacy River—a tributary of the Potomac—swelled to 14 feet (4.3 m) above flood stage, inundating the city of Frederick and compromising the city's supply of fresh drinking water. A final downpour of rain on the night of September 25–26 led to an additional 4 inches (100 mm) of rain in central Maryland triggered severe flash flooding. In some cases, this onslaught affected the same areas that were still recovering from Hurricane Agnes several years earlier, including Ellicott City, Elkridge, and Laurel, where two major rivers breached their banks and engulfed nearby areas. Many homes and businesses were lost, along with numerous vehicles; in the aftermath, looters entered on boats to access the devastated cities. The floodgates at the Rocky Gorge Dam in Laurel were opened, forcing 500 residents downstream to leave their homes.

The consequences of the flooding rains were the worst seen in areas of the interior Mid-Atlantic states since Agnes, and comparisons were often drawn between the two hurricanes. In Pennsylvania alone, flooding from the remnants of Eloise forced 20,000 residents out of their homes; thousands further south in the Washington, D.C. area, where severe flooding impacted the city's southern suburbs, also fled to seek refuge. Further, many motorists throughout the region became stranded on highways inundated by floodwaters. Four Mile Run and nearby streams overflowed and "tumbled through residential neighborhoods". Hundreds of families in the Alexandria and Arlington, Virginia area suffered flood-related losses. Across the Northeastern U.S., the storm system killed 17 people and inflicted $300 million in damage. An instance of a storm-induced fatality is the death of a man in White Plains, New York, who was killed by waters raging across the Hutchinson River Parkway. Agriculturally, the extended period of wet weather threatened a range of crops, including the Rhode Island apple crop, of which 35% was feared to have been destroyed, and corn and sweet potato fields in North Carolina. With ground too moist for farm machinery to operate on, harvests were postponed.

== Aftermath ==
After touring the disaster area, Florida Governor Reubin Askew noted, "I think we're going to have to take a long, close look at some of the construction [...] Some of the structures simply won't be able to be built back in the exact location where they were." Governor Askew recruited 400 National Guard troops to prevent looting following the storm. He also requested the initial declaration of five counties along the Florida panhandle as national disaster areas, and stated that he would consider adding two more counties. The declaration would make residents in the counties recognized as disaster areas eligible to receive federal aid. Immediately following the storm, the mayor of Panama City criticized the state of Florida for failing to provide sufficient post-storm aid. Despite the destruction, the storm reportedly had some economic benefits; in the midst of rebuilding and recovery, business grew, especially in and around Panama City, and people began to move into the area. In at least one instance, the hurricane and its associated storm surge had a lasting effect on local geography, breaching Crooked Island in Bay County to create an inlet 0.75 miles (1.21 km) wide referred to as Eloise Inlet. Eloise provided a comprehensive base of information on beach and dune erosion along the Florida panhandle, which aided in the programming of certain erosion prediction numerical models. In 1995, reports from the aftermath of Hurricane Opal created a more extensive collection of data.

On September 26, President Gerald Ford approved the declaration for Florida, and later issued a separate declaration for 30 counties in Pennsylvania as the storm's flooding rains progressed northward. Pennsylvania Lieutenant Governor Ernest Kline assigned 600 National Guardsmen to assist in the evacuation of flood victims and maintain security in storm-ravaged areas. Over $430 million in federal disaster relief was spent overall in 1975 and distributed to 92,000 families; the bulk of the funds went to recovery for areas affected by Hurricane Eloise along its entire course. In Maryland, Governor Marvin Mandel placed 10 of the state's 23 counties under a state of emergency.

On account of the severe damage caused by the hurricane, the name Eloise was retired at the end of the 1975 season. It will never again be used to name a tropical storm in the Atlantic basin.

== See also ==
- List of Category 3 Atlantic hurricanes
- List of Florida hurricanes
- List of Maryland hurricanes (1950–1979)
- List of New York hurricanes
- List of Pennsylvania hurricanes
- Hurricane Elena (1985)
- Hurricane Opal (1995)
