= Gustavus =

Gustavus may refer to:

- Gustavus, Alaska, a small community located on the edge of Glacier Bay National Park and Preserve
- Gustavus Adolphus College, a private liberal arts college in southern Minnesota
- Gustavus (name), a given name
  - Gustavus, the Latin name given to several Swedish kings:
    - Gustav I of Sweden (Gustav Vasa)
    - Gustavus Adolphus of Sweden (Gustav II Adolf)
    - Gustav III of Sweden
    - Gustav IV Adolf of Sweden
    - Gustaf V of Sweden (1858–1950)
    - Gustaf VI Adolf of Sweden (1882–1973)
- Operation Gustavus, World War II British commando operation in Malaya
- Gustavus (horse)

== See also ==
- Gustav (disambiguation)
- Gusty (disambiguation)
