= Gustavs Vanags =

Latvian chemist

- Born: 10 March 1891 (Russia) Žagare parish, Kovno Governorate, Russian Empire (now in Latvia)
- Died: 8 May 1965 (aged 74) (Soviet Union) Riga, Latvian SSR, USSR
- Education: University of Latvia
- Known for: Contribution to diketone chemistry
- Awards: 1959 State Award of Latvian SSR; 1961 Order of the Red Banner of Labour
- Scientific career
- Fields: Chemistry (organic)
- Workplaces: University of Latvia; Riga Polytechnic Institute
- Academic advisors: Paul Walden
- Doctoral students: Emīlija Gudriniece; Jānis Polis

Gustavs Vanags (10 March 1891 — 8 May 1965) was a Soviet and Latvian organic chemist, full member of Latvian SSR Academy of Sciences. He was also one of the signers of the Memorandum of Latvian Central Council in 1944.

== Biography ==
Gustavs Vanags was born in "Rungas" house of the Schnicken (Sniķeru) manor (now in Ukri Parish, Auce Municipality). He received primary education in the Mitau Classic Gymnasium, and in 1910 enrolled Riga Polytechnic Institute. During the First World War, he, among many, went in evacuation to the inner regions of Russian Empire; after returning from it in 1921, he completed his education in the new-founded University of Latvia and worked at the Faculty of Chemistry, raising to the position of the chair of the Department of organic chemistry. He received his habilitation in 1932.

After Riga Polytechnic Institute was reestablished in 1958, G. Vanags moved to it, serving in the same position as the department chair until 1965. Simultaneously he also worked in the State Institute of Organic Synthesis, where he carried out his research in the chemistry of cyclic β-diketones. He was founder of Riga scholl of organic chemists specializing on β-diketones, which continues up to day (2020). Gustavs Vanags, along with his students, designed and synthesized several compounds of notable application in medicine, agriculture and chemical analysis (omefin, bindon, nitroindandione, rhodenticide diphenadione or ratindan).

Gustavs Vanags died in a sudden death on May 8, 1965, in Riga. He was buried in the Forest Cemetery.

== Commemoration ==
Latvian Academy of Sciences named a biannual prize for advances in chemistry in Gustavs Vanags' name.

A commemorative plaque with bas-relief of G. Vanags is installed in the hall of Riga Technical University Faculty of Chemistry. A commemorative stone is erected at the place where his native house of "Rungas" once stood.
