= Gustaw, Afghanistan =

Gustaw Gustāw
- Location in Afghanistan
- Coordinates: 37°1′28″N 73°54′2″E
- Country: Afghanistan
- Province: Badakhshan Province
- District: Wakhan
- Time zone: + 4.30

Gustaw is a village in Badakhshan Province in north-eastern Afghanistan.
