= List of storms named Gustav =

The name Gustav was used for five tropical cyclones in the Atlantic Ocean:

- Tropical Storm Gustav (1984) - Spent most of its existence as a tropical depression hovering over Bermuda, no major damage was reported.
- Hurricane Gustav (1990) - A category 3 hurricane that threatened the Lesser Antilles but turned away before getting too close, causing no damage.
- Tropical Storm Gustav (1996) - A weak storm that formed west of Africa and dissipated soon thereafter, never threatening land.
- Hurricane Gustav (2002) - First subtropical storm to ever be named; strengthened into a Category 2 hurricane and came within miles of Cape Hatteras, North Carolina before turning away, later grazing Nova Scotia and dying over Newfoundland. It was the latest first hurricane of any Atlantic season since 1941.
- Hurricane Gustav (2008) - A strong Category 4 hurricane that caused over $6 billion in damage and 138 deaths in Haiti, the Dominican Republic, Jamaica, the Cayman Islands, Cuba, and the United States.

The name Gustav was retired in the spring of 2009 and was replaced by Gonzalo for the 2014 Atlantic hurricane season.
