= Gustav Adolph (barque) =

Norwegian barque wrecked east of Cape Town in 1902

Coordinates: 34.349738°S 18.985773°E

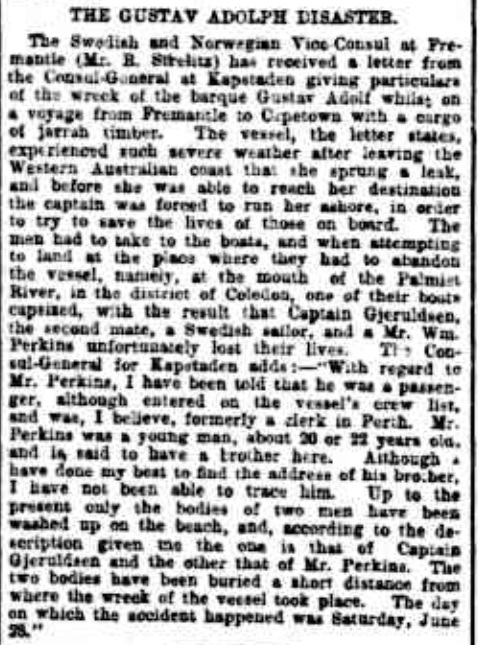
- Item from The West Australian of 3 September 1902

History
- Name: Gustav Adolph
- Builder: Arendal, Norway
- Completed: 1879
- Fate: Wrecked 1902 in South Africa

General characteristics
- Type: Barque
- Tonnage: 757 GRT

Gustav Adolph was a Norwegian barque of 757 tons built in 1879 in Arendal, Norway, and wrecked in 1902 on the South African coast some 90 km (56 mi) east of Cape Town.

En route from Fremantle to Cape Town under Captain Anton Gjeruldsen (1862 Barbu, Norway - 1902) with a cargo of 14,000 jarrah sleepers, intended for use by the burgeoning Cape Government Railways, she was wrecked in a strong gale on 28 June 1902 just west of the Palmiet River mouth. Two lifeboats were lowered; the first, carrying six crewmen, made it safely ashore while aboard the second, carrying five people, only one crewman survived. Drowned aboard the second boat were the Captain Gjeruldsen, two crewmen, and a Mr. Perkins, who was a clerk from Perth. Gjeruldsen left behind his wife Inga, 10 years his junior and from Øyestad; a 1900 census showed that the couple were childless.

The greater part of the cargo of sleepers washed ashore and was salvaged. Two crosses made from salvaged timber were erected in memory of those who lost their lives.
