= Carl Gustav of Sweden =

Carl Gustav of Sweden - English also often: Charles Gustavus; Swedish also: Karl Gustav - may refer to:

- Carl X Gustav, King of Sweden 1654–1660
- Carl XVI Gustaf, King of Sweden from 1973–Present
- Carl Gustav, Prince of Sweden 1686, son of King Carl XI (died in infancy)
- Carl Gustav, Prince of Sweden 1782, son of till King Gustav III (died in infancy)
- Carl Gustav, Prince of Sweden 1802, son of till King Gustav IV Adolph (died in infancy)
