= Hurricane Gustav (2002) =

Category 2 Atlantic hurricane

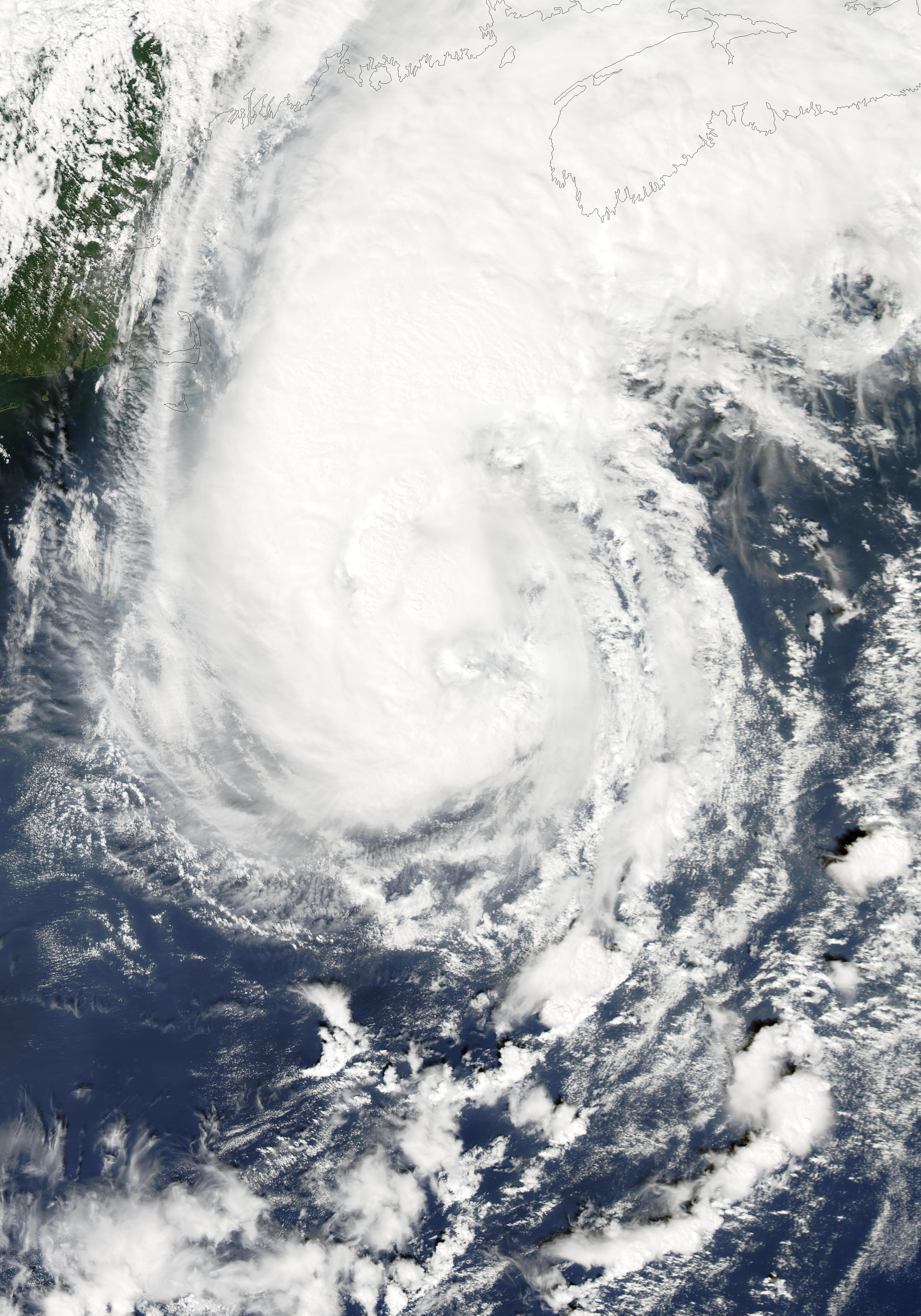
- Gustav near peak intensity off the New England coast on September 11

Meteorological history
- Formed: September 8, 2002
- Extratropical: September 12, 2002
- Dissipated: September 15, 2002

Category 2 hurricane
- 1-minute sustained (SSHWS/NWS)
- Highest winds: 100 mph (155 km/h)
- Lowest pressure: 960 mbar (hPa); 28.35 inHg

Overall effects
- Fatalities: 7 total
- Damage: $195,000 (2002 USD)
- Areas affected: East Coast of the United States, Nova Scotia, Newfoundland, Atlantic Canada
- IBTrACS
- Part of the 2002 Atlantic hurricane season

Hurricane Gustav in 2002 was the first named subtropical cyclone from the current Atlantic tropical cyclone naming list. It was the seventh named storm and first hurricane of the 2002 Atlantic hurricane season. At the time, Gustav was the latest-forming first hurricane of the season since 1941, a record that was broken by Isaias 24 years later in 2026. Gustav formed as a subtropical depression on September 8 off the east coast of the United States, which gradually strengthened. The storm initially had several circulations and a broad center, but it slowly transitioned into a tropical cyclone, a process completed by September 10. Soon thereafter, Gustav brushed the Outer Banks of North Carolina before curving to the northeast. It strengthened further, attaining hurricane status on September 11, and reaching peak winds of 100 mph (155 km/h). Gustav weakened before striking Nova Scotia early on September 12. Soon after, it transitioned into an extratropical cyclone as it moved across Newfoundland, dissipating on September 15.

High surf from Gustav killed a swimmer in Myrtle Beach, South Carolina. While the storm passed near the Outer Banks of North Carolina, it produced heavy rainfall, high tides, and a weak tornado. In Hatteras, 40 people required rescue from the storm surge. Gustav interacted with a high pressure area to produce strong winds across the northeastern United States, peaking at 67 mph (108 km/h) in Catskill, New York. The winds led to six fatalities – five due to fallen tree or tree limbs, and one due to a shipwreck – as well as at least 22 injuries. The downed trees damaged three homes and several vehicles, while leaving at least 326,500 people lost power. Later, Gustav became the first landfalling Canadian hurricane within observation of a Doppler weather radar. At two locations in Nova Scotia, Gustav produced wind gusts of 76 mph (122 km/h), strong enough to knock down trees and power lines.

== Meteorological history ==
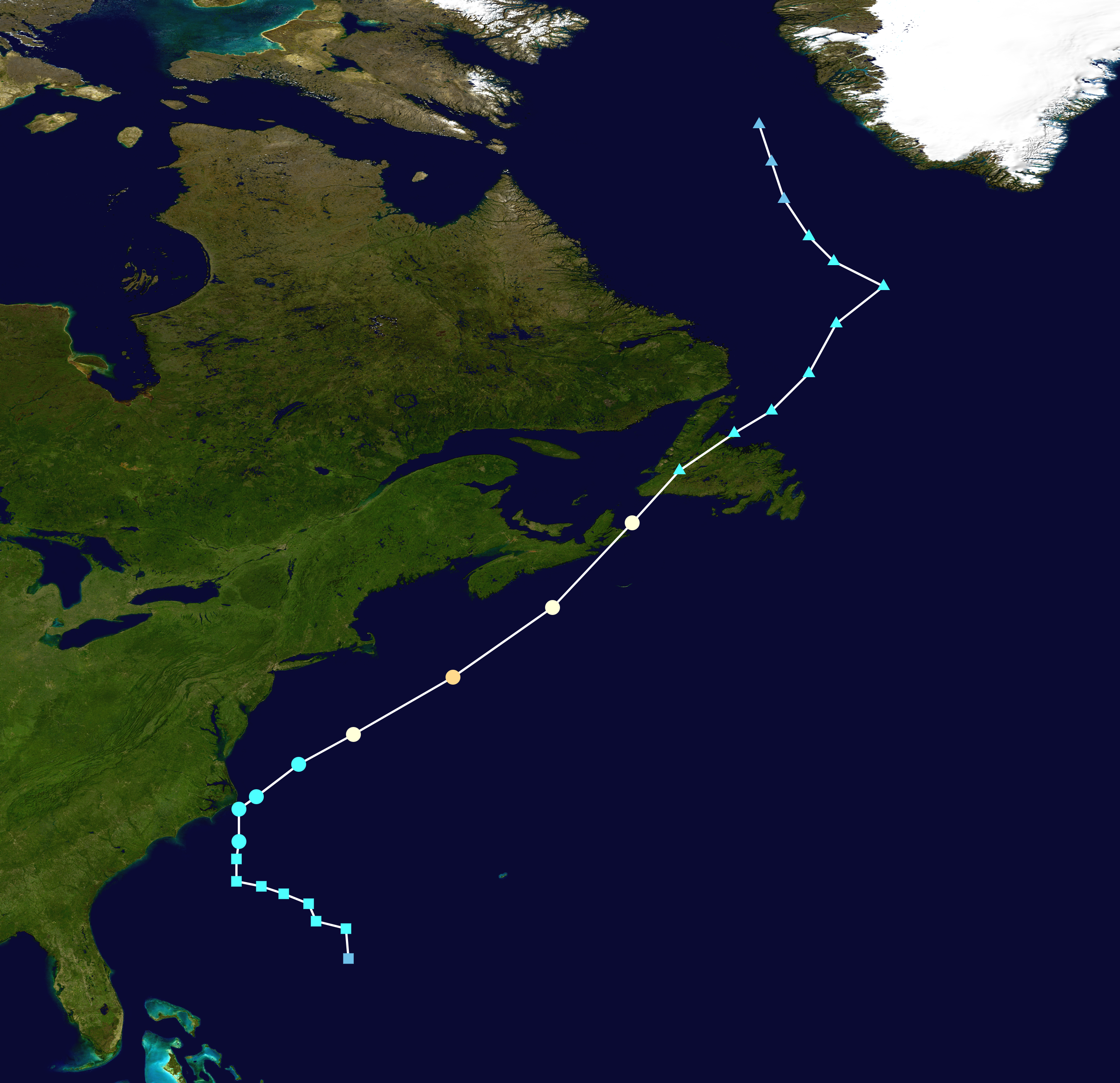
Map plotting the storm's track and intensity, according to the Saffir–Simpson scale Map key Saffir–Simpson scale Tropical depression (≤38 mph, ≤62 km/h) Tropical storm (39–73 mph, 63–118 km/h) Category 1 (74–95 mph, 119–153 km/h) Category 2 (96–110 mph, 154–177 km/h) Category 3 (111–129 mph, 178–208 km/h) Category 4 (130–156 mph, 209–251 km/h) Category 5 (≥157 mph, ≥252 km/h) Unknown Storm type Tropical cyclone Subtropical cyclone Extratropical cyclone, remnant low, tropical disturbance, or monsoon depression

On September 6, an area of convection, or showers, formed between the Bahamas and Bermuda. The weather system developed in association with a weak surface trough and an upper-level trough. Over the next two days, the upper-level trough strengthened to a nearby ridge that was being enhanced by Tropical Storm Fay in the Gulf of Mexico. This caused the thunderstorms to increase, leading to the formation of a surface low pressure area late on September 7. After further organization, the system developed into Subtropical Depression Eight by 12:00 UTC on September 8, located about 505 mi (815 km) southeast of Cape Hatteras, North Carolina. The subtropical designation was due to the system's broad, poorly-defined center. Late on September 8, it intensified into Subtropical Storm Gustav, based on observations from a Hurricane Hunters aircraft. Gustav was the first subtropical storm named from the current Atlantic tropical cyclone naming list, due to a decision in late 2001; previously, the National Hurricane Center (NHC) issued advisories, but not names, for subtropical cyclones.

After becoming a named storm, Gustav moved erratically to the west-northwest, with several surface circulations, and light winds near the center. At the time, it was steered by a large ridge over the eastern United States. With low wind shear and warm waters, Gustav gradually strengthened as it developed more convection and outflow. On September 10, Gustav turned to the north as it developed a band of strong winds near the center. By 12:00 UTC that day, it transitioned into a tropical cyclone, just off the southeast coast of North Carolina. The storm's multiple circulations rotated around each other until one became the main vortex by 19:25 UTC on September 10.

Around 21:00 UTC on September 10, the center of Gustav passed between Diamond Shoals and Cape Hatteras, North Carolina, as its strongest winds spread over the Outer Banks. The storm turned northeastward at that time, influenced by the flow of a developing non-tropical cyclone ahead of an approaching trough. Gustav strengthened further as it absorbed the non-tropical low, in what NHC forecaster Jack Beven described as a "complex process similar to that seen in Hurricane Michael in 2000". Just before 12:00 UTC on September 11, Gustav attained hurricane status, becoming the first hurricane of the season. At the time, it marked the latest date for the season's first hurricane since 1941, which was later surpassed by Isaias in 2026. Gustav strengthened further to reach peak winds of 100 mph (155 km/h), and a minimum pressure of 960 mbar (28 inHg), as measured by the Hurricane Hunters. It was located about 185 mi (300 km) southeast of Nantucket.

Soon after reaching peak intensity, Gustav began weakening. Although the hurricane briefly had an eye-like feature, the convection quickly became more ragged as the track passed north of the Gulf Stream. Around 04:30 UTC on September 12, Gustav made landfall over Cape Breton, Nova Scotia, with winds of 90 mph (150 km/h). However, the hurricane's low-level and mid-level circulations were displaced due to increased wind shear, which caused the strongest winds to be well away from the center. Around 09:00 UTC, Gustav was becoming an extratropical cyclone as it made a second landfall over southwestern Newfoundland. By that time, there were little thunderstorms associated with the storm. The circulation entered the Labrador Sea as it curved to the northwest. The extratropical remnants of Gustav slowly weakened until dissipating on September 15 between Labrador and Greenland.

== Preparations and impact ==
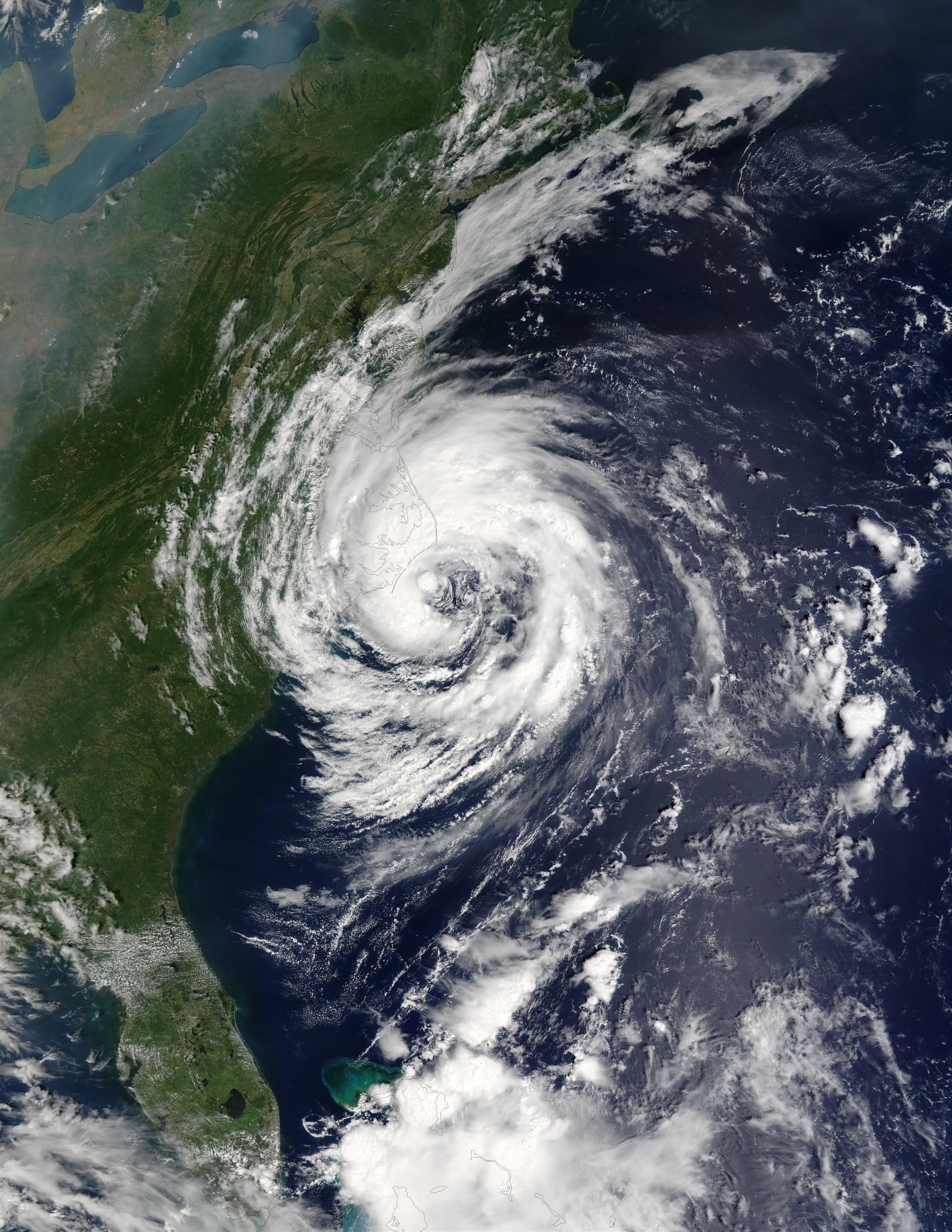
Tropical Storm Gustav near the Outer Banks on September 10

=== United States ===
The threat of the storm led to tropical storm warnings from Cape Fear, North Carolina, to the southern Chesapeake Bay south of New Point Comfort. The National Park Service closed the Cape Lookout National Seashore. Schools in two coastal counties closed due to the storm.

In Myrtle Beach, South Carolina, a swimmer died two days after being injured by Gustav's high surf. While the storm passed near the Outer Banks, Gustav produced tropical storm-force winds across eastern North Carolina. Wind gusts at the Cape Hatteras Coast Guard station reached 78 mph (126 km/h). The storm produced a waterspout that moved ashore Ocracoke. The tornado, rated F0 on the Fujita scale, damaged the roofs of a few buildings. Rainfall from Gustav peaked at 6.00 in (152 mm) in New Holland. The storm also produced a 5 to 6 ft (1.5 to 1.8 m) storm surge above normal high tide along the inland side of the Outer Banks, during a period of strong northwest winds after the center passed the area. Floodwaters reached 15 ft (4.6 m) deep along North Carolina Highway 12 from Ocracoke to Rodanthe. Several businesses around Ocracoke and Hatteras were damaged, while 40 people required rescue in Hatteras. There were brief power outages in the area. Damage to property and vehicles across North Carolina was estimated at $100,000 (2002 USD). Storm tides also reached 1 to 2 ft (0.30 to 0.61 m) above normal in southeastern Virginia.

Across the northeastern United States, gusty winds were generated by the interaction between Gustav and a high-pressure area over the central United States, causing widespread tree damage and six fatalities. Three of the deaths were in New Jersey. At Westfield High School in the city of the same name, the winds snapped a rotted tree limb, which killed a student and injured 12 others. In West Amwell Township, a tree limb struck and killed a woman. In West Windsor, a worker died when a wall collapsed in the building under construction. In New York, a boat capsized off City Island in the western Long Island Sound, killing a man and injuring three passengers. In Westport, Connecticut, a driver died when a tree struck the vehicle. In Buckingham Township, a falling tree killed the passenger of a car along U.S. Route 202. In Manhattan, debris from construction sites injured four people, including one critically. Falling trees injured two people in New Jersey, and one person in Massachusetts. Several vehicles were damaged by the trees. A home was damaged by a fallen tree limb in Hudson, New York, and two homes were damaged by trees in Rhode Island. Downed trees and wires closed parts of U.S. 202 and 206 in New Jersey, as well as U.S. 20 in New York. Wind gusts peaked at 67 mph (108 km/h) in Catskill, New York. Elsewhere, wind gusts reached 60 mph (97 km/h) in Keansburg, New Jersey, 46 mph (74 km/h) at the Lehigh Valley International Airport in northeast Pennsylvania, and 44 mph (71 km/h) in Tolchester Beach, Maryland, and at the Wilmington, Delaware airport. Power outages affected about 140,000 people in Connecticut, 122,500 customers in New York, about 42,000 PECO energy customers in Pennsylvania, about 14,000 people in New Jersey, 4,000 people in Rhode Island, and 4,000 Connectiv energy customers across Delaware and Maryland. Downed power wires caused a few small brush fires in Pennsylvania, New Jersey, and Rhode Island. Damage across New York, Rhode Island, and Massachusetts totaled $95,000. In New York, the strong winds disrupted a 9/11 memorial service, though it continued as planned. Later, the outer circulation of Gustav produced strong winds across Maine that knocked down trees.

=== Atlantic Canada ===
The Canadian government issued heavy rain and wind warnings for southern New Brunswick, Prince Edward Island, Nova Scotia, and northwestern Newfoundland. There were vehicle restrictions on the Confederation Bridge, and ferry service temporarily paused between Nova Scotia and Newfoundland.

Gustav was the first landfalling Canadian hurricane to be observed on Doppler weather radar, when it passed 20 mi (30 km) southeast of Marion Bridge, Nova Scotia. The storm was starting to lose tropical characteristics at the time of landfall. The highest wind gust was 76 mph (122 km/h), recorded on Sable Island and St. Paul Island, strong enough to knock down trees and power lines. About 4,000 people lost power in Halifax, Nova Scotia, and 12 communities lost electricity in Prince Edward Island. Wind gusts over 60 mph (97 km/h) persisted on Newfoundland for several days after Gustav exited the area. Rainfall reached 4.25 in (108 mm) in Lyons Brook, Nova Scotia, and 70 mm (2.8 in) in Charlottetown, Prince Edward Island. Several communities in Nova Scotia had daily rainfall records, and a portion of the Trans-Canada Highway was closed. Gustav also produced above normal tides in Atlantic Canada, including a 4 to 5 ft (1.2 to 1.5 m) storm surge in Prince Edward Island, causing some flooding. High tides damaged docks in southern Nova Scotia.

== See also ==
- Tropical cyclone
- Subtropical cyclone
- Other storms of the same name
- List of North Carolina hurricanes (2000–present)
- List of Canada hurricanes
