= List of Delaware hurricanes =

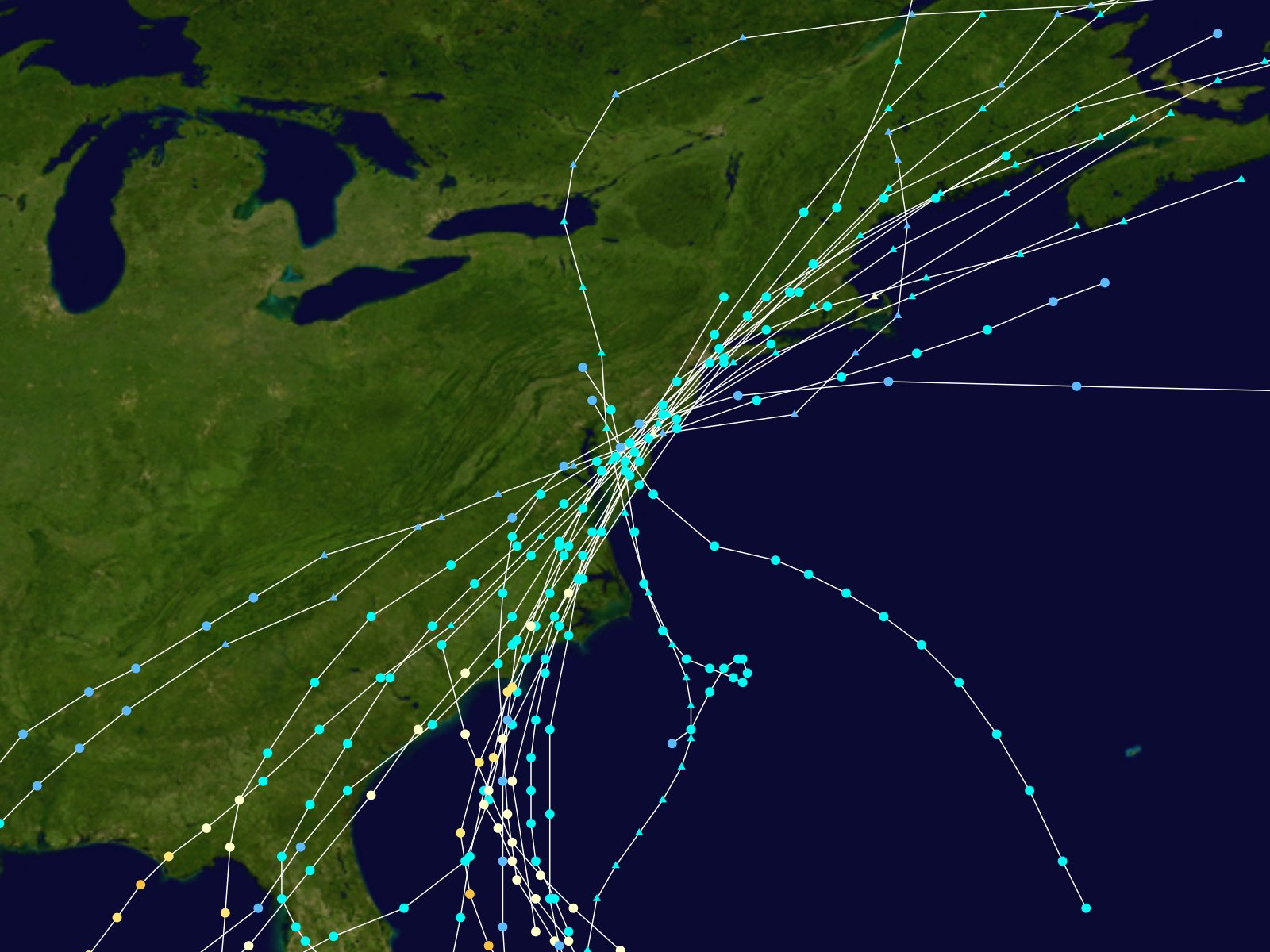
Track map of all tropical cyclones that passed over Delaware from 1851 to 2005

The following is a list of tropical cyclones that affected the U.S. state of Delaware. Since reliable records began, no tropical cyclone has struck the state while maintaining hurricane intensity, and only two storms since 1851 caused hurricane-force winds in the state. The state often experiences the direct effects of landfalling North Atlantic tropical cyclones and from the remnants of some Pacific storms, such as rainfall or strong winds, as well as the effects of storms that remain offshore, such as rip currents or heavy surf. Since 1749, at least 111 tropical cyclones, some of which had become extratropical, have affected the state, including 21 which passed over the state.

== List of tropical cyclones ==
=== Pre-1900 ===
- October 21, 1749 – A hurricane impacted the Mid-Atlantic, and impacts were observed in Delaware, but it's unclear at what strength the storm was when it impacted the state.
- Fall, 1783 – Nine large ships crashed near Cape Henlopen during a gale, killing several people.
- September 2, 1785 – A hurricane caused 181 deaths in the state. Whether or not it made landfall is unknown.
- September 3–5, 1815 – A tropical storm passed over extreme southeastern Delaware. Effects, if any, are unknown.
- September 3, 1821 – The eye of the Norfolk and Long Island Hurricane moved directly over Cape Henlopen for 30 minutes.
- August 17, 1830 – A hurricane that passed to the east of the state capsized three ships along the Delaware capes.
- August 28–31, 1839 – Several ships were washed ashore in Lewes during a hurricane that paralleled the East Coast of the United States.
- September 8, 1846 – Rough seas and troubled shipping in the Delaware Bay were caused by a hurricane offshore.
- October 13, 1846 – A hurricane crossed over northwestern Delaware, with its powerful winds toppling the steeple of a church in New Castle. The hurricane's storm surge, which was considered the worst in 70 years, flooded lowlands in the northern portion of the state.
- July 18, 1850 – Rough seas were reported along the Delaware Bay due to a hurricane passing to the west of the state.
- August 4, 1850 – A hurricane crossed the state, causing gale-force winds along the coast.
- September 8, 1850 – Many ships reported calls of distress due to powerful winds from a hurricane.
- August 20, 1856 – A tropical storm paralleled the coastline of the Delmarva Peninsula, though impact, if any, is unknown.
- September 28, 1861 – After weakening from a hurricane, a tropical storm moved northward through Delaware. Effects are unknown.
- September 19, 1863 – A tropical storm crossed the state from south to north. Effects are unknown.
- October 28, 1872 – A tropical storm crossed the state, with no known effects.
- September 29, 1874 – With winds of 70 mph (115 km/h), a tropical storm moved across Delaware.
- October 5, 1877 – An extratropical storm, once a Category 3 hurricane, crossed the state, causing several ship wrecks in the Chesapeake and Delaware Bays.
- October 23, 1878 – The Gale of 1878, which made landfall on North Carolina, brought hurricane-force winds to the entire state of Delaware. The storm dropped over 3 inches (76 mm) of rainfall in the northern portion of the state, flooding portions of Wilmington. The winds and rain from the storm damaged or destroyed many houses statewide. The flooding washed out railroads, roads, and bridges, and destroyed many carriages in Dover. Crop damage was severe, as well. The strong winds wrecked four ships, in total killing 14. A 7-foot (2.1 m) storm surge in Lewes drowned four when they couldn't escape the rising waters. Beach erosion was severe, as well. Across Delaware, the hurricane killed 18 and caused $45,000 in damage (1878 USD, $1 million 2008 USD). It is one of only three storms to bring hurricane-force winds to the state.
- August 18, 1879 – A Category 2 hurricane paralleled the Delmarva Peninsula after striking North Carolina, though effects, if any, are unknown.
- September 23, 1882 – A tropical storm crossed over southeastern Delaware. Impact, if any, is unknown.
- June 23, 1886 – A tropical depression moved across the state, with no known impact.
- September 11, 1888 – An extratropical storm crossed the state.
- September 9–12, 1889 – After moving northwestward for much of its life, a large hurricane approached the East Coast of the United States, moved southwestward, and dissipated to the east of Virginia. The hurricane caused severe waves and a powerful storm surge, damaging life guard stations and wrecking or washing 31 vessels ashore. The death toll "would probably exceed 40", while damage totaled $570,000 (1889 USD, $13.6 million 2008 USD).
- October 10, 1894 – A hurricane passed to the southeast of the state.
- October 23–26, 1897 – A tropical storm moving northward prompted officials to issue hurricane warnings from North Carolina through New York, though the storm unexpectedly executed a loop and moved out to sea.

=== 1900–1949 ===
- September 16, 1903 – The Vagabond Hurricane paralleled the Delmarva Peninsula coastline and made landfall on southern New Jersey, bringing Category 1 hurricane-force winds to Delaware. It is one of only three storms to bring hurricane-force winds to the state. The hurricane washed a schooner ashore, killing five.
- September 15, 1904 – A tropical storm became extratropical as it moved across the state, killing eight people when a tugboat capsized.
- October 24, 1923 – Once a tropical storm in the Caribbean, an extratropical storm moved northwestward through Delaware, causing no known damage.
- August 24, 1933 – After making landfall on the Outer Banks, the 1933 Chesapeake Potomac hurricane passed through Virginia and Maryland. Higher than normal tides washed out about 1 square mile (2.6 km^{2}) of beaches along the Delaware coastline, while strong winds caused $150,000 in damage (1933 USD, $2.5 million 2008 USD).
- September 18, 1936 – A Category 2 hurricane paralleled the Delmarva Peninsula, causing higher than usual tides at Lewes.
- September 21, 1938 – The New England Hurricane of 1938 produced moderate to heavy amounts of precipitation across the entire state.
- August 20, 1939 – The remnants of a hurricane that struck the Florida Panhandle dropped heavy rainfall across the state.
- October 1, 1943 – A tropical storm that made landfall on Maryland passed over western Delaware, though effects, if any, are unknown.
- August 3, 1944 – A tropical storm crossed the state, causing no known effects.
- September 14, 1944 – The 1944 Great Atlantic Hurricane paralleled the East Coast of the United States just offshore, causing damage to 1,800 homes and 850 other buildings. No fatalities were reported in the state.

=== 1950–1974 ===
- September 1, 1952 – Tropical Storm Able passed a short distance to the northwest of the state. Damage, if any, is unknown.
- August 31 & September 11, 1954 – Hurricanes Carol and Edna paralleled the Delmarva Peninsula offshore, causing no known damage.
- October 15, 1954 – Hurricane Hazel passed to the west of the state, bringing wind gusts of over 100 mph (160 km/h). The hurricane causes at least one death in the state.
- August 1955 – Hurricanes Connie and Diane passed to the west of the state during the month, bringing over 8 inches (200 mm) of rain to the Philadelphia metropolitan area and causing record-breaking flooding.
- September 19, 1955 – Hurricane Ione made landfall in North Carolina, with its outer moisture producing light rainfall across the state.
- September 28, 1956 – The remnants of Hurricane Flossy dropped light rainfall along the coastline.
- August 29, 1958 – Hurricane Daisy remained offshore, though caused rough seas along the coast.
- July 30, 1960 – Tropical Storm Brenda crossed over southeastern Delaware. Effects, if any, are unknown.
- September 12, 1960 – Hurricane Donna passed to the east of the state, causing hurricane-force gusts, above normal tides, strong surf, and storm surge to the coastline.
- September 15, 1961 – An unnamed tropical storm moved across the state. Damage, if any, is unknown.
- September 21, 1961 – Hurricane Esther moved northward through the western Atlantic Ocean, causing heavy rains, rough seas, and a strong storm surge of 6 to 7 feet (1.8 to 2.1 m). The waves produced coastal flooding along the Maryland and Delaware coastline.
- October 29, 1963 – Hurricane Ginny produced trace precipitation in the state.
- September 14, 1964 – Tropical Storm Dora caused above-normal tides and light rain to Delaware.

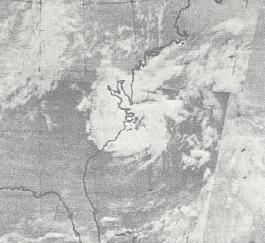
Hurricane Doria making landfall

- October 1964 – Moisture from Hurricane Hilda produced light amounts of precipitation across the state.
- October 17, 1964 – The remnants of Hurricane Isbell dropped light rainfall throughout the state.
- September 16, 1967 – Hurricane Doria made landfall in Virginia from the east, causing winds of up to 50 mph (80 km/h) with gusts of 83 mph (134 km/h) in Indian River Bay in Delaware. The hurricane also caused tides of 6.5 feet (2.0 m) above normal.
- August 20, 1969 – Passing to the south of the state as a tropical depression, former Hurricane Camille dropped moderate precipitation peaking at 3.31 inches (84 mm) in Georgetown.
- September 9, 1969 – Hurricane Gerda attained major hurricane status well to the east of the state, though its outer rainbands resulted in light to moderate precipitation across the state.
- August 28, 1971 – Tropical Storm Doria moved through the state, dropping rainfall of up to 5.09 inches (129 mm) in Wilmington and causing high tides.
- October 1, 1971 – Hurricane Ginger made landfall on North Carolina, with its remnants producing light rainfall in Delaware.
- June 22, 1972 – Tropical Storm Agnes passed to the east of the state, dropping moderate amounts of rainfall of up to 7.6 inches (190 mm) in Middletown and causing higher than normal tides. The storm caused light damage and one death in Delaware.
- September 3, 1972 – Tropical Storm Carrie passed well to the east of the state, with its outer rainbands dropping moderate rainfall across much of southern Delaware.

=== 1975–1999 ===
- September 24, 1975 – Hurricane Eloise became an extratropical frontal low over Virginia, though its tropical moisture dropped over 5 inches (130 mm) of rainfall in the northern portion of the state.
- August 9, 1976 – Hurricane Belle paralleled the Delmarva Peninsula, prompting officials to issue hurricane warnings for the Delaware coastline. The core of the hurricane passed slightly to the east of the state, and consequentially produced lighter winds and less rainfall than expected but still a powerful storm.
- September 6, 1979 – Tropical Storm David passed to the west of the state, causing high tides and up to 1.96 inches (50 mm) of rain in Wilmington. The tornado outbreak caused by David extended into Delaware. One such tornado damaged a few homes and injured five in New Castle County.
- July 1, 1981 – Tropical Storm Bret moved ashore along the Delmarva Peninsula and produced light rainfall in Delaware.
- November 15, 1981 – A subtropical storm slowly moved through the western Atlantic, causing higher than normal tides along the Delaware coastline.
- September 30, 1983 – Tropical Storm Dean produced light rainfall in southeastern Delaware when it made landfall in eastern Virginia.
- October 1983 – The remnants of Hurricane Tico dropped light rainfall across the state.

Hurricane Gloria passing to the east of the state

- July 26, 1985 – The outer bands of Hurricane Bob produced light rainfall of around 1 inch (25 mm) in the northern portion of the state.
- August 19, 1985 – The remnants of Hurricane Danny dropped up to 7 inches (180 mm) of rain in southeastern Delaware.
- September 24, 1985 – While paralleling the state, Tropical Storm Henri dropped light rainfall of around 1 inch (25 mm) near the coast.
- September 27, 1985 – Hurricane Gloria passed to the east of the state, causing hurricane-force wind gusts and moderate amounts of rainfall. The hurricane caused significant beach erosion along the coast.
- August 18, 1986 – Hurricane Charley paralleled the Mid-Atlantic coastline offshore, producing hurricane-force wind gusts and light rainfall in Delaware.
- September 1987 – Tropical Depression Nine dropped light precipitation in the state.
- August 29, 1988 – Tropical Depression Chris produced light rainfall across Delaware, though damage, if any, is unknown.
- July 1989 – Moisture from Tropical Storm Allison produced up to 7 inches (180 mm) of rain in northern Delaware.
- August 19, 1991 – Hurricane Bob dropped 1.84 inches (47 mm) of rainfall in the state, along with peak wind gusts of 51 mph (82 km/h). There were no reports of damage in the state.
- August 1992 – The remnants of Hurricane Andrew produced light rainfall in the state.
- September 26, 1992 – Tropical Storm Danielle moved northwestward through the state, causing severe beach erosion and washouts along the coast. It also produces over 3 inches (76 mm) of rain in the middle portion of the state.
- September 1, 1993 – Hurricane Emily passed well to the southeast of Delaware, causing trace amounts of precipitation and slightly higher than normal tides in Lewes.

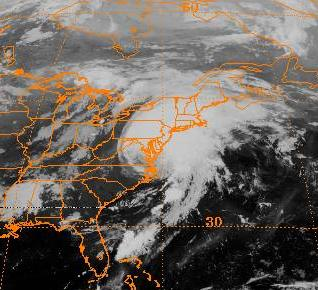
Tropical Storm Bertha over Delaware

- August 18, 1994 – The remnants of Tropical Storm Beryl produced light rainfall across the state.
- November 1994 – The outer rainbands of Hurricane Gordon dropped light rainfall of around 1 inch (25 mm) in Delaware.
- June 6, 1995 – The remnants of Hurricane Allison caused light amounts of rainfall in the state's southeastern portion.
- August 6, 1995 – Moisture from the remnants of Hurricane Erin produced moderate amounts of precipitation of up over 3 inches (76 mm) in the state.
- August 13–21, 1995 – Swells and 10 feet (3.0 m) waves generated by Hurricane Felix restricted beaches along the coastline. In addition, the waves caused beach erosion and minor tidal flooding.
- July 13, 1996 – Tropical Storm Bertha crossed over the state with a peak wind gust of 58 mph (93 km/h) at Dover. The winds downed scattered trees, signs, and power lines, leaving 3,200 homes without power for 8 hours. The storm produced moderate rainfall across the state, causing drainage problems. Prior to moving across the state, Bertha caused rough surf, resulting in 40 water rescues. Overall damage was minor, and no deaths occurred.
- August 29–31, 1996 – Hurricane Edouard caused rough surf along the Delaware coastline, closing some beaches.
- October 8, 1996 – The remnants of Tropical Storm Josephine caused 45 mph (70 km/h) wind gusts and light rainfall of up to 2.37 inches (60 mm) in Dover. The rainfall caused river flooding, while the wind knocked down tree limbs.
- July 25, 1997 – Tropical Storm Danny passed to the southeast of the state, dropping light precipitation throughout Delaware.
- August 28, 1998 – Strong waves and rip currents were caused by Hurricane Bonnie over the western Atlantic Ocean. The currents drowned one person and result in bathing restrictions and over 14 lifeguard rescues at Rehoboth Beach. Coastal Delaware experienced the fringe effects of the storm, including minor beach erosion, wind gusts of up to 46 mph (74 km/h), and light rainfall peaking at 1.77 inches (45 mm) in Greenwood.

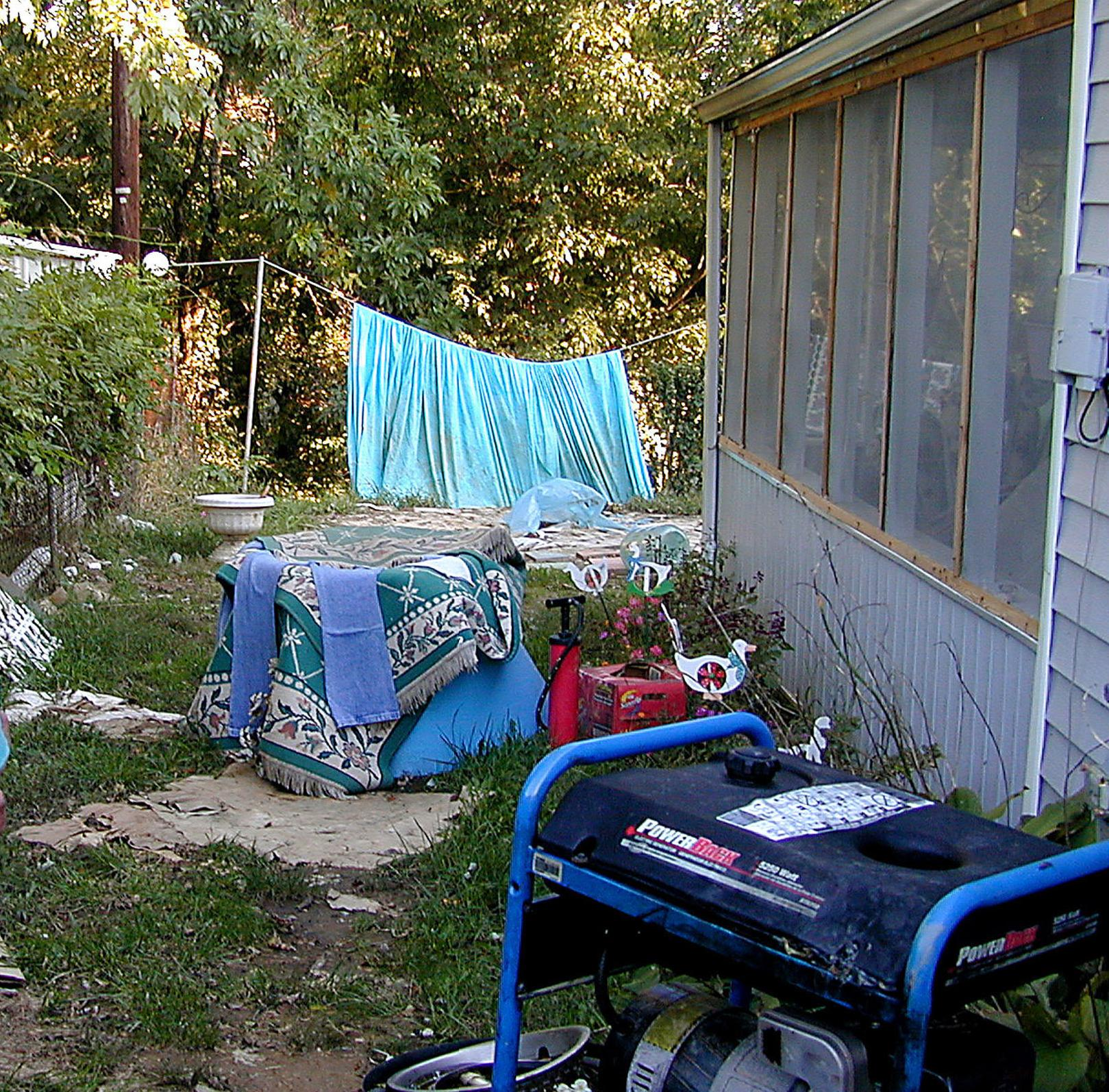
Hurricane Floyd damage

- August 29–31, 1999 – The combination of swells from Hurricane Dennis and strong northeasterly winds produced strong rip currents along the Delaware coastline. The currents resulted in nearly 100 rescues and four injuries, and also forced beach closures and restrictions. The strong winds and waves caused beach erosion, as well.
- September 16, 1999 – Tropical Storm Floyd crossed over the southeastern portion of the state. The storm produced strong wind gusts of up to 64 mph (103 km/h) in Sussex County and heavy rainfall peaking at 10.58 inches (269 mm) in Greenwood, a 24-hour state record. The flooding, which exceeded the 100-year flood return period, killed two and caused record-breaking river levels across the state. Hundreds of roads, railroad lines, and bridges were closed or destroyed, trapping dozens due to flooded vehicles. The winds uprooted hundreds of trees, leaving 25,000 homes and businesses without power for three days. Floyd damaged 171 homes, 44 severely, and destroyed 33 in New Castle County. Damage was minimal near the ocean, and amounted to minor beach erosion and tidal flooding. Throughout the state, damage totaled to $8.42 million (1999 USD, $10.9 million 2008 USD). In response to the damage, President Bill Clinton declared the state as a disaster area, which allowed for federal funding to rebuild and cleanup after the storm.
- October 17, 1999 – Moisture from Hurricane Irene produced rainfall across the state, ranging from 1 to 4 inches (25 to 102 millimetres). The flooding caused some drainage problems, though damage was minor.

=== 2000–2008 ===
- September 19, 2000 – The remnants of Hurricane Gordon produced heavy rainfall for a few hours, resulting in rainfall totals of up to 1.82 inches (46 mm) in Newark. The precipitation caused the Christina River to crest at 9.13 feet (2.78 m) above flood stage, though damage was minimal.
- June 16, 2001 – The subtropical remnant of what was once Tropical Storm Allison passed just to the southeast of the state. The storm dropped moderate amounts of rainfall, peaking at 4.2 inches (110 mm) in Greenwood, which resulted in drainage problems yet little damage.
- September 11, 2001 – Hurricane Erin generated rough surf and rip currents along Delaware beaches, forcing restrictions and closures.
- July 3, 2003 – The remnants of Tropical Storm Bill crossed over the state, dropping light rainfall of around 1 inch (25 mm).
- September 15, 2003 – Moisture from the remnants of Tropical Storm Henri produced heavy rainfall over portions of Delaware, including a peak of 9.02 inches (229 mm) in Hockessin. The flooding damaged hundreds of houses, and trapped motorists in submerged vehicles. Several bridges were destroyed or damaged due to rising flood waters, including the Red Clay Creek which peaked at 17.27 feet (5.26 m). Damage totaled $16.1 million (2003 USD, $18.9 million 2008 USD). Due to the damage, President George W. Bush declared the state a disaster area.
- September 17, 2003 – Hurricane Isabel passed to the southwest of the state as it made landfall in North Carolina. In the days preceding its landfall, Isabel produced strong waves, and upon striking land, the storm caused a 5-foot (1.5 m) storm surge along the Delaware coast. The waves and surge resulted in beach erosion and overwash. The outer rainbands of Isabel dropped around 1 inch (25 mm) of rain, though the storm's large circulation produced strong wind gusts of up to 70 mph (115 km/h). The wind gusts knocked down many trees and power lines, causing one of the worst power outages for Conectiv Energy. Damage totaled to $40 million (2003 USD, $54.6 million 2019 USD). Due to the damage, President Bush declared the entire state a disaster area.

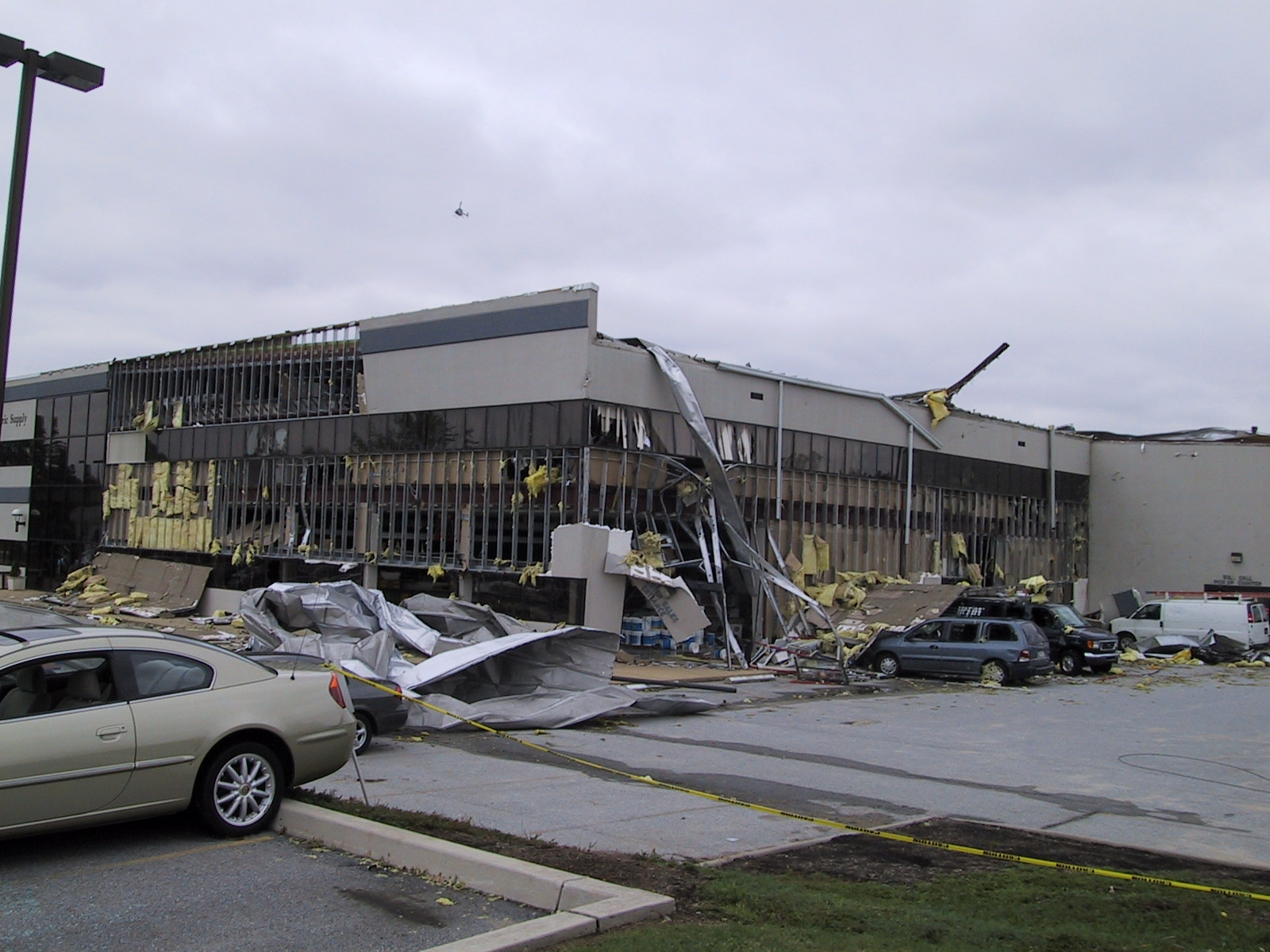
Tornado damage from Hurricane Jeanne

- August 3, 2004 – Heavy surf from Hurricane Alex injured three in Rehoboth Beach. The rough waters resulted in rescues, as well.
- August 12, 2004 – The remnants of Tropical Storm Bonnie produced heavy rainfall of over 3 inches (76 mm). The rainfall lead to flooded rivers and roads, forcing the evacuation of 100 people in Delaware City.
- August 30, 2004 – Moisture from Hurricane Gaston dropped moderate amounts of rainfall, leading to minor stream and drainage flooding.
- September 3, 2004 – The combination of swells from Hurricane Frances and a high-pressure system caused rip currents along the Delaware coastline.
- September 18, 2004 – The remnants of Hurricane Ivan produced heavy rainfall for a few hours, causing creek flooding and drainage problems. Damage was minimal.
- September 28, 2004 – The remnants of Hurricane Jeanne, combined with two cold fronts, produced heavy rainfall peaking at 8.01 inches (203 mm) in Newark. The precipitation lead to rising rivers, including the Red clay Creek which crested at 13.59 feet (4.14 m) The rainfall also flooded roads in the northern portion of the state, resulting in trapped vehicles. The remnants of Jeanne also spawn an F2 tornado in northern New Castle County. The tornado's 5 miles (8.0 km) path includes moving through the New Castle Airport and several buildings. The tornado damages numerous planes and buildings at the airport and injures five people. Damage totals to around $1 million (2004 USD).
- July 8, 2005 – The extratropical remnants of Hurricane Cindy moved through the state, producing heavy rainfall of up to 4.55 inches (116 mm) in Delmar. The combination of rain and 20 to 30 mph (32 to 48 km/h) wind gusts downed a few weak trees, leaving around 100 without power in New Castle County.
- Mid-July 2005 – The outer rainbands of Hurricane Dennis dropped light precipitation of around 1 inch (25 mm) throughout the state.
- September 16, 2005 – Rip currents were caused by Hurricane Ophelia passing to the southeast of the state.
- October 7, 2005 – Tropical Storm Tammy contributed to the Northeast U.S. flooding of October 2005, which resulted in heavy rainfall of up to 5.3 inches (130 mm) in Lincoln. The rainfall caused drainage problems and crop damage.
- October 24, 2005 – The combination of Hurricane Wilma and a Nor'easter produced heavy surf, high tides, and beach erosion along the coastline.
- June 14, 2006 – The extratropical remnants of Tropical Storm Alberto dropped light rain in the southeastern portion of the state.
- September 1, 2006 – The combined effects of Tropical Storm Ernesto and a large high-pressure system left about 151,000 without power and several trees damaged from strong winds. The system also dropped moderate rainfall peaking at 5.15 inches (131 mm) in Jones Crossing; one person required assistance to be rescued from a flooded roadway.
- June 4, 2007 – The remnants of Tropical Storm Barry dropped light rainfall in the state.
- September 6, 2008 – Tropical Storm Hanna produced heavy rain and strong winds in the state. Minor tidal flooding was reported in the Delaware Bay.

=== 2010s ===
- August 27–28, 2011 – Hurricane Irene brought heavy rain to the state; a high of 10.43 inches (265 mm) was recorded in Ellendale, with a tornado in Lewes causing damage to about 50 homes and destroying one. Two fatalities can be attributed to the storm in the state.
- September 7–10, 2011 – The remnants of Tropical Storm Lee moved over the east coast, resulting in strong winds and heavy rain.
- October 28 – November 1, 2011 – Hurricane Rina did not affect the United States directly, but its remnants joined with a large cold front to fuel the 2011 Halloween nor'easter.
- September 1–4, 2012 – The remnants of Hurricane Isaac moved over the eastern coast, causing heavy rains over Delaware and other east coast states.
- October 29–30, 2012 – Hurricane Sandy affected the entire state.
- September 19, 2017 – Waves from Hurricane Jose caused coastal flooding in Delaware.
- October 11–12, 2018 – Wind and rain from Tropical Storm Michael caused minor coastal flooding, heavy rain and some strong winds in the Delmarva Peninsula.

=== 2020s ===
- July 7, 2020 – Tropical Storm Fay passed just east of state, producing gusty winds and heavy rainfall to the region.
- August 4, 2020 – Hurricane Isaias moved directly across the state, spawning tornadoes and widespread power outages, resulting in the first hurricane related death since 2011.
- October 29, 2020 – Hurricane Zeta affected Delaware as a post-tropical cyclone.
- July 8, 2021 - Hurricane Elsa is moving northeast and will bring heavy rain, gusty winds and isolated tornadoes to parts of the Delaware Valley.
- August 31, 2021 - The remnants of Hurricane Ida brought heavy rains and flooding to the Delaware River Basin.
- October 1, 2022 - Hurricane Ian caused flooding along parts of coastal Delaware.
- August 21, 2025 - Hurricane Erin brought large waves and strong winds to Delaware beaches, causing swimming prohibitions and drawing onlookers.
- October 1, 2025 - The remnants of Hurricane Humberto are impacting Delaware with dangerous rip currents, according to the National Hurricane Service.
- October 30, 2025 - Hurricane Melissa made landfall throughout the Delaware Valley.
- October 11, 2026 - The remnants of Hurricane Isaias could bring heavy rain, isolated flooding and thunderstorms to Delaware.

== Listed by month ==
Since 1749, 108 tropical cyclones, including some that became extratropical, have affected the state. Most have occurred in September, which coincides with the peak of the Atlantic hurricane season.

Number of recorded storms affecting Delaware
Month	Number of storms
June	6
July	10
August	33
September	45
October	23
November	2

== Deadliest storms ==
Most tropical cyclones that impact Delaware only cause rainfall or strong waves, though a few have caused deaths in the state. Storms that caused deaths in Delaware include:

Name	Year	Number of deaths
Unnamed	1785	181
Unnamed	1879	"Probably exceed 40"
Hurricane Ida	2021	23
Gale of 1878	1878	18
Unnamed	1904	8
Vagabond Hurricane	1903	5
Unnamed	1783	"Several"
Floyd	1999	2
Irene	2011	2
Hazel	1954	≥1
Agnes	1972	1
Isaias	2020	1

== See also ==
- List of New Jersey hurricanes
- Atlantic hurricane season
- List of Atlantic hurricanes
- Tropical cyclone
- Effects of Hurricane Isabel in Delaware
