= List of New Jersey hurricanes =

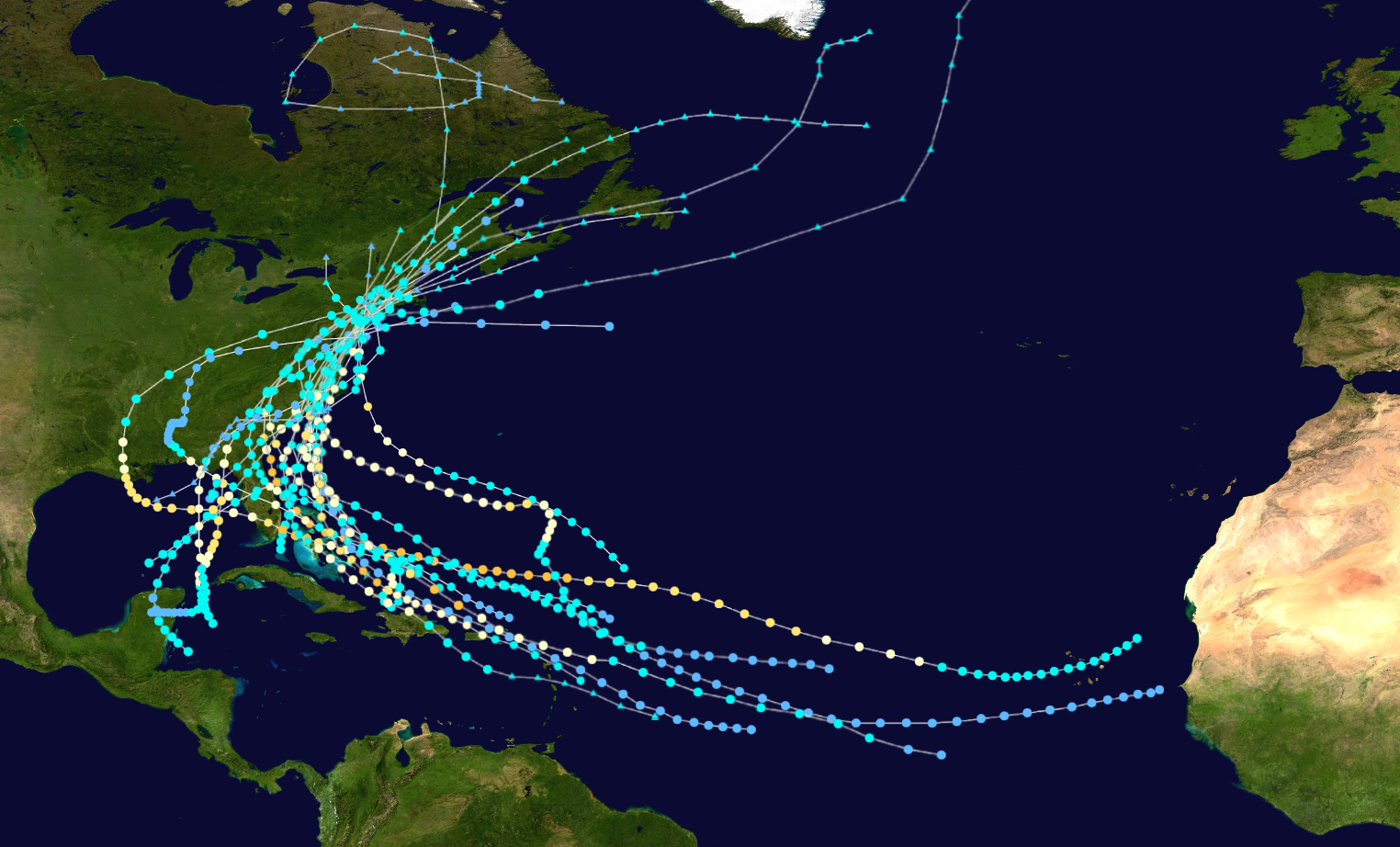
Tracks of all tropical cyclones to pass through New Jersey from 1851 through 2022

There have been 115 hurricanes or tropical storms that affected the U.S. state of New Jersey. Because of its location, few hurricanes have hit the state directly, though numerous hurricanes have passed near or through New Jersey in its history. About every 10 years, hurricanes approach the coastline close enough to send waves over barrier islands' dunes and into back bays. According to an estimate by meteorologist George Prouflis, the chances for a direct hit by a hurricane on the Jersey Shore each year is 1 in 200.

New Jersey has seen the remnants of several once-powerful hurricanes, some resulting in heavy damage. Nine storms dropped over 10 in (250 mm) of rainfall in the state, including a hurricane in 1940 that interacted with a cold front and dropped 24 in (610 mm) of rainfall in Ewan. Numerous hurricanes that remained offshore have each drowned small numbers of swimmers.

== List of tropical cyclones ==
Most of the following are tropical cyclones that passed through the state after weakening from their peak.

=== Pre–1900 ===
In the 19th century, two hurricanes struck the coastline, each in 1804 and in 1821; both caused minor damage. The most significant storm of the century was the Gale of 1878, which produced hurricane-force winds across western New Jersey. The hurricane caused severe damage and 11 deaths.

- 1278–1438 – Sedimentary layers indicate a powerful hurricane hit the state's coastline during this time period.
- October 9, 1804 – The Storm of October 1804 struck near Atlantic City as a strong Category 2 or weak Category 3 hurricane, sinking or beaching many ships in the Mid–Atlantic. The hurricane later produces a snow storm in New England.
- August 23, 1806 – A ship off Barnegat Island sunk during the 1806 Great Coastal hurricane, killing 21 people.
- September 22, 1815 – The Great September Gale of 1815 caused heavy damage along the New Jersey coastline while remaining offshore, though exact totals are unknown.
- August 9, 1817 – A tropical storm moved through the western portion of the state.
- September 3, 1821 – An estimated Category 4 hurricane hits near Cape May. Accompanied by a five-foot storm surge, damage is great in the small town, though is only moderate along the coastline due to the sparse population. No known deaths are associated with the hurricane in the state.
- August 30, 1839 – An offshore hurricane forced the floating light in Sandy Hook to break loose and set adrift.
- October 3, 1841 – An offshore hurricane dropped rain and snow in New Brunswick.
- October 13, 1846 – The Great Havana Hurricane of 1846 passed near or over the state, destroying many houses, downing many trees, and drowning several livestock.
- July 18, 1850 – A tropical storm passed to the west of the state, causing heavy rain and crop damage in Burlington.
- August 25, 1850 – A hurricane passing south of Cape May dropped over 3 inches (7.6 cm) of rain in New Brunswick.
- September 8, 1850 – An offshore hurricane produced high winds and 2.6 inches (6.6 cm) of rain in Newark.
- September 28, 1861 – A strong tropical storm passed over the state.
- September 19, 1863 – A moderate tropical storm crossed the state.
- October 30, 1866 – A moderate tropical storm brushed the northeastern portion of the state before entering New York.
- October 26, 1872 – A tropical storm moves across New Jersey with winds of 45 mph (70 km/h).
- August, 1873 – Though it never made landfall on the United States, the Great Nova Scotia Cyclone approached the state, prompting the U.S. Army Signal Corps to issue a hurricane warning from Cape May to New Haven, Connecticut.
- September 29, 1874 – A tropical storm moved through the state.
- October 23, 1878 – The Gale of 1878 struck North Carolina and moved into the Mid-Atlantic, producing winds of up to 84 mph (135 km/h) in Cape May. The hurricane causes high tides and strong flooding, destroying several houses along the coastline, and washing out several railroad lines. Strong winds destroyed around 150 houses in Camden. The hurricane killed eight people in the state.
- September 12, 1882 – A tropical storm passing south of the state caused strong winds and damage along the coastline.
- September 24, 1882 – A weak tropical storm paralleled the coastline.
- June 23, 1886 – A tropical depression crossed the state.
- September 10, 1889 – A hurricane stalled offshore the state and lashed the coastline with high winds, beach erosion, and severe storm tides.
- August 24, 1893 – A hurricane passed just east of the state before making landfall near New York City. The hurricane produced strong winds and rainfall along the coastline.

=== 1900–1949 ===
Hurricane activity was above average during this time period. A hurricane in 1903 hit near Atlantic City, causing heavy damage near the shore. The most severe hurricane in the time period was the 1944 Great Atlantic Hurricane. Though it did not make landfall, it brought strong winds and waves to the coastline, destroying hundreds of homes.

- September 16, 1903 – A hurricane made landfall on Atlantic City with winds of 80 mph (130 km/h) hurricane, making it the most recent hurricane to directly strike the state. Dubbed by the Atlantic City Press as the Vagabond hurricane, the storm gathered media interest from Philadelphia and New York, with one newspaper offering $200,000 (1903 USD) to aid the survivors. When the reporters arrived at the coast, they are disappointed at the lack of damage, which was confined to loose boards along the boardwalk. The storm's strong surf destroyed several boats along the coastline, including 34 in Waretown.
- August 4, 1915 – A tropical depression crossed the northern portion of the state, though damage totals are unknown.
- August 23, 1933 – A hurricane made landfall in the Outer Banks and moved through Pennsylvania. Its large circulation produced heavy rainfall and hurricane-force wind gusts in Atlantic City, where damage reached $3 million (1933 USD). High waves killed two people.
- September 19, 1936 – An offshore, Category 2 hurricane flooded much of Long Beach Island and caused severe beach erosion along the coast. About 200 feet (61 m) of sand near the Barnegat Lighthouse was lost, threatening the foundation of the lighthouse.
- September 21, 1938 – The New England Hurricane of 1938 passed to the east of the state, causing strong winds of up to 100 mph (160 km) and powerful waves along the coastline. The bridge to Brigantine collapsed, leaving the city marooned. The Fall tomato crop was ruined, and half of the apple harvest was destroyed.
- August 20, 1939 – Tuckerton received 14.8 inches (380 mm) of precipitation from a former hurricane. The storm caused major flooding in the Pine Barrens, washing away a historic village and derailing a train in Chatsworth.
- September 1, 1940 – A hurricane interacting with a cold front dropped 24 in (610 mm) of rainfall in Ewan, making it the wettest tropical cyclone in state history. Flooding damage totaled $4 million (1940 USD), and there were four deaths.
- August 1, 1944 – A tropical storm hit Cape May after passing through the Delmarva Peninsula, causing severe beach erosion and high tides.
- September 13–September 14, 1944 – The "Great Atlantic hurricane" paralleled the coastline, causing severe flooding, a storm surge of up to 9.6 feet (2.9 m), and intense waves of up to 40 feet (12 m) in height. Along the entire coastline, strong winds gusting to 125 mph (200 km/h) destroyed hundreds of homes and damaged thousands, while the ferocious waves washed away fishing piers and boardwalks. Rainfall from the storm reached 11.98 in (304 mm) near New Brunswick. The hurricane caused $25 million (1944 USD) in damage and nine deaths in the state.

=== 1950–1979 ===
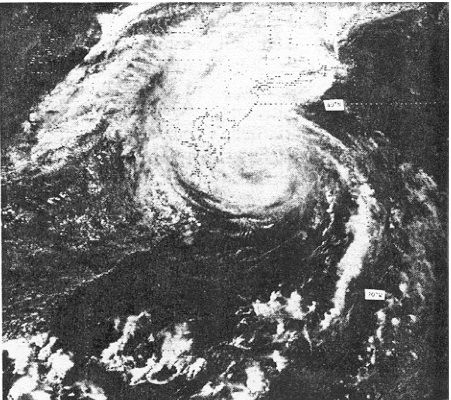
Hurricane Belle south of New Jersey

Several tropical cyclones affected the state during the time period, though Hurricane Donna was the most severe. Paralleling the coastline offshore, the hurricane caused heavy damage near the coastline from high waves and winds. In addition, Hurricane Belle was predicted to strike the state, though it passed to the east with only minor effects.

- August 20, 1950 – Offshore Hurricane Able dropped 3.85 in (98 mm) in Marlboro Township.
- September 1, 1952 – Tropical Depression Able moved across the northern portion of the state, dropping 6.14 in (156 mm) of rainfall in Oak Ridge.
- August 14, 1953 – Offshore Hurricane Barbara dropped 8.18 in (208 mm) of rainfall near Cape May. Slick roads caused a deadly traffic accident on the New Jersey Turnpike.
- August 31, 1954 – Hurricane Carol caused gusty winds along the coastline and moderate damage.
- September 10, 1954 – Hurricane Edna skirted the coastline, producing tropical storm force winds of up to 65 mph and dropping 4 inches of rain in Long Branch.
- October 15, 1954 – Hurricane Hazel passed well to the west of New Jersey, producing very high winds but only sporadic rainfall. Wind gusts peak at 92 mph in Teterboro.
- August 12–13, 1955 – Hurricane Connie threatened the state, prompting coastal evacuations, but instead passed inland to the state's west. The storm dropped heavy rainfall, reaching 11.48 in (292 mm) in Vernon Township. Connie caused power outages and killed six people.
- August 19–20, 1955 – Hurricane Diane moved across Central Jersey only a week after Connie deluged the area, triggering heavy rains that reached 8.10 in (206 mm) of rainfall in Sussex. The rains caused severe flooding along the major Delaware, Passaic, and Raritan rivers. Three people drowned along the Millstone River. About 200 homes were damaged or destroyed in Lambertville. Statewide damage was estimated at $27.5 million (1955 USD).
- September 19, 1955 – Hurricane Ione passed southeast of the state, dropping over 3 inches (76 mm) of rainfall in South Jersey.
- September 28, 1956 – The remnants of Hurricane Flossy dropped 2.04 in (52 mm) of rain in Belmar.
- June 29, 1957 – The remnants of Hurricane Audrey moved through Pennsylvania and New York. The storm dropped 1.59 in (40 mm) of rainfall in Ringwood.
- June 2, 1959 – Remnant moisture from Tropical Storm Arlene dropped 3.04 in (77 mm) of rain near Swedesboro.
- July 10, 1959 – Offshore Tropical Storm Cindy produced 8.43 in (214 mm) of rain in Belleplain State Forest.
- October 1, 1959 – The extratropical remnants of Hurricane Gracie produced light precipitation in the state.
- July 30, 1960 – Tropical Storm Brenda moved across the state, dropping 5.40 in (137 mm) of rainfall in Jersey City.
- September 12, 1960 – Hurricane Donna moved up the East Coast of the United States and passed offshore New Jersey, causing heavy damage along the coast, but less than other states struck directly by Donna. The hurricane produced 105 mph (170 km/h) wind gusts and a storm surge of 6 feet (1.8 m) near Atlantic City, and 8.99 in (228 mm) of rainfall near Hammonton,. One person died related to a heart attack during the storm.
- September 15, 1961 – A tropical storm crossed the state, dropping light rainfall.
- September 20, 1961 – Offshore Hurricane Esther caused high surf and 70 mph (115 km/h) winds at beaches in New Jersey.
- August 28, 1962 – The outer rainbands of Hurricane Alma dropped 0.97 in (25 mm) of rainfall in Bass River State Forest.
- October 29, 1963 – The outer rainbands of Hurricane Ginny dropped 0.61 in (15 mm) in Mahwah.
- September 14, 1964 – Hurricane Dora caused high tides of up to 4 feet (1.2 m) and rainfall peaking at 2.5 inches (6.4 cm).
- June 13, 1966 – Hurricane Alma approached the coast before turning northeastward and becoming extratropical. The storm caused a high tide of 4.5 feet (1.4 m) in Atlantic City.
- September 16, 1967 – Hurricane Doria sank a boat offshore Ocean City, killing three people. The storm produced light rainfall, reaching 1.19 in (30 mm) in Freehold. The storm caused minor damage along the coast.
- June 26, 1968 – The remnants of Tropical Storm Candy dropped 3.31 in (84 mm) of rainfall near Layton.
- August 20, 1969 – Passing south of the state as a re-intensifying storm, Tropical Storm Camille dropped 1.62 in (41 mm) of rainfall near Cape May.
- September 7, 1969 – Offshore Hurricane Gerda dropped 2.58 in (66 mm) of rainfall in Cape May.
- August 28, 1971 – Tropical Storm Doria moved through the entire state, dropping 10.29 in (261 mm) of rainfall in Little Falls. The heavy rainfall caused record flooding on streams and rivers. Doria killed three people and left $138 million in damage in New Jersey.
- October 1, 1971 – Hurricane Ginger struck North Carolina, and dropped 1.64 in (42 mm) of rainfall in Seabrook Farms.
- June 23, 1972 – Tropical Storm Agnes made landfall on extreme western Long Island, New York, and during the storm's passage, Canton reported 6.34 inches (16.1 cm) of rainfall. There was little statewide damage.
- September 3, 1972 – Tropical Storm Carrie produced 2.32 in (59 mm) of rainfall in Belleplain State Forest.
- September 25, 1975 – The remnants of Hurricane Eloise caused flooding in the state after dropping 10.51 in (267 mm) of rainfall near New Brunswick.
- August 10, 1976 – Prior to the arrival of Hurricane Belle from the south, 250,000 people evacuated from the shore during the peak of the tourist season. The hurricane caused winds of 65 mph (105 km/h) and gusts of up to 90 mph (145 km/h). In addition, the hurricane caused a storm surge of 8.85 feet (2.70 m) in Atlantic City, and 5.66 in (144 mm) of rainfall in Sandy Hook. Damage was less than expected.
- September 17, 1976 – The remnants of a subtropical storm dropped light rainfall in the state.
- August 29, 1978 – A cold front absorbed Tropical Storm Debra and later dropped 2.89 in (73 mm) of rainfall near Tuckerton.
- September 6, 1979 – Hurricane David passed to the east of the state, causing 58 mph (93 km/h) wind gusts, light rainfall, and at least one tornado. The wind gusts left people without power after the storm.

=== 1980s ===
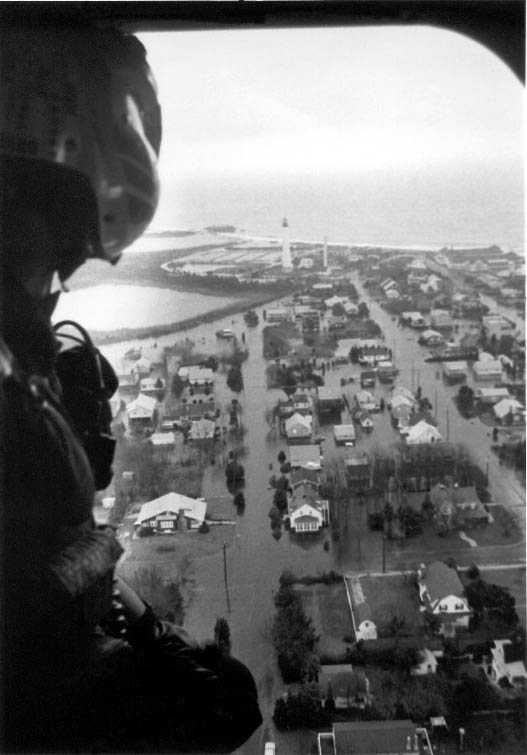
Flooding from Hurricane Gloria in Cape May

The 1980s were a relatively active decade, with 11 tropical cyclones affecting the state. The most notable storm of the decade was Hurricane Gloria in 1985, which was originally predicted to strike the state. The hurricane caused minor damage throughout the state.

- September 30, 1983 – Tropical Storm Dean moved ashore the Delmarva Peninsula. Newark Liberty International Airport recorded 2.85 in (72 mm) of rainfall.
- October 14, 1984 – High surf from Hurricane Josephine caused minor damage and coastal flooding.
- October 29, 1984 – A tropical depression crossed the state, bringing light rainfall throughout the state.
- July 26, 1985 – The remnants of Hurricane Bob dropped 3.52 in (89 mm) of rainfall in Vernon Township.
- August 25, 1985 – The remnants of Hurricane Danny dropped 3.31 in (84 mm) of rainfall in Cape May.
- September 24, 1985 – Tropical Storm Henri passed to the east of the state, causing light rainfall.
- September 27, 1985 – Hurricane Gloria paralleled the New Jersey coastline just offshore as a Category 2 hurricane, forcing 95,000 people to evacuate. In Atlantic City, 11 casinos were closed, resulting in a loss of $7 million (1985 USD). Dubbed by some as the storm of the century, the hurricane was expected to become the first hurricane to hit the New Jersey coastline since the hurricane in 1903, though a last minute turn spared the state. While passing by the state, Gloria caused a storm surge of 4.6 feet (1.4 m) in Ventnor City and a wind gust of 80 mph (129 km) in Ocean City. Strong winds down trees and power lines, leaving 237,000 without power after the storm. Overall, damage is minor, and some were even disappointed at the lack of damage from the proclaimed storm of the century. One person was killed in Long Branch after touching a downed power line.
- August 18, 1986 – Hurricane Charley came within 100 miles (160 km) of the state, but turns out to sea. The hurricane dropped 1.3 inches (3.3 cm) of rain, as well as a 1.6 feet (0.49 m) storm surge in Atlantic City.
- August 30, 1988 – Tropical Depression Chris moved across the northern portion, producing 2.19 in (56 mm) of rainfall at High Point State Park.
- July 1989 – Moisture from Tropical Storm Allison dropped 5.11 in (130 mm) in Audubon, New Jersey.
- September, 1989 – Offshore Hurricane Gabrielle produced strong waves of up to 16 feet (4.9 m) in height, killing one person.
- September 22, 1989 – Hurricane Hugo passed to the west of the state, causing over 5 inches (13 cm) of rain in North Jersey.

=== 1990s ===
The "Perfect Storm" east of New Jersey

Thirteen tropical cyclones affected New Jersey during the 1990s. The 1991 Perfect Storm eroded beaches severely along the coast, while Hurricane Floyd in 1999 produced severe flooding in northern New Jersey, killing six.

- October, 1990 – The combined remnants of Hurricane Klaus and Tropical Storm Marco caused around 3 inches (7.6 cm) of rain in the northern portion of the state.
- August 19, 1991 – Offshore Hurricane Bob dropped 4.98 in (126 mm) of rainfall at the Millville Executive Airport.
- October 31, 1991 – The 1991 Halloween Nor'easter, also known as the Perfect Storm, caused strong waves of up to 30 feet (9.1 m) in height. High tides along the shore were only surpassed by the 1944 hurricane, while significant bay flooding occurred. Strong waves and persistent intense winds caused extreme beach erosion, amounting to 13.5 million cubic feet (383,000 m^{3}) of sand lost in one location. In all, damage amounted to $90 million (1991 USD), though no deaths occurred in the state.
- August 28, 1992 – The Essex Fells Service Building recorded 1.60 in (41 mm) of rainfall from the remnants of Hurricane Andrew.
- September 26, 1992 – Tropical Storm Danielle moved inland over the Delmarva Peninsula, causing beach erosion and tidal flooding during a 7.2 ft (2.2 m) high tide in Atlantic City. Strong waves off the coast of New Jersey sank a sailboat, causing one death.
- August 18, 1994 – Tropical Depression Beryl crossed over the extreme northern portion of the state, dropping 3.82 in (97 mm) rainfall.
- November 22, 1994 – Offshore Hurricane Gordon produced 2.11 in (54 mm) of rainfall in Ringwood.
- June 6, 1995 – During the passage of the extratropical remnants of Hurricane Allison, Canoe Brook Country Club in Union County recorded 2.06 in (52 mm) of rainfall.
- August 7, 1995 – The remnants of Hurricane Erin dropped 3.92 in (100 mm) of rainfall in Belleplain State Forest.
- Mid–August, 1995 – Strong rip currents from Hurricane Felix killed five people, while persistent cyclonic winds caused extensive beach erosion.
- October 5, 1995 – As an extratropical storm, Hurricane Opal produced up to 5 inches (13 cm) of rainfall in the northern portion of the state.
- July 13, 1996 – Tropical Storm Bertha crossed the entire state, causing heavy rainfall peaking at 6.59 inches (16.7 cm) in Estell Manor. Bertha also caused a storm surge of 2.27 feet (69 cm) in Atlantic City, while rough waves killed one surfer.
- Late August, 1996 – Offshore Hurricane Edouard produced strong swells to the coastline, causing two deaths from drowning.
- September 8, 1996 – Hurricane Fran passed to the west of the state through central Pennsylvania and western New York and sparks an intense line of severe thunderstorms that crosses New Jersey and is most notable for causing an hour-long lightning delay of an NFL game between the New York Jets and Indianapolis Colts at Giants Stadium in East Rutherford. This marked the first time a regular season NFL contest had been suspended due to weather conditions.
- July 25, 1997 – Passing southeast of the state, Tropical Storm Danny dropped 7.81 in (19.8 cm) of rainfall near New Brunswick.
- August 23, 1998 – Tracking offshore after striking North Carolina, Hurricane Bonnie produced rough waves and rip currents, resulting in hundreds of water rescues and eight injuries.
- September 6, 1999 – Tropical Depression Dennis moved northward through central Pennsylvania, and dropped 5.59 in (142 mm) of rainfall at Greenwood Lake along the New Jersey/New York border.
- September 16, 1999 – Tropical Storm Floyd crossed the entire state, unleashing torrential rainfall reaching 14.13 in (359 mm) in Little Falls. Cape May reported a storm surge of 2.6 feet (0.79 m). Five rivers, including the Raritan River, withhold too much water and exceed flood stages. Strong wind gusts leave over 650,000 citizens without power during the storm's passage. Across New Jersey, Floyd caused about $250 million in damage (1999 USD) and six casualties.

=== 2000s ===
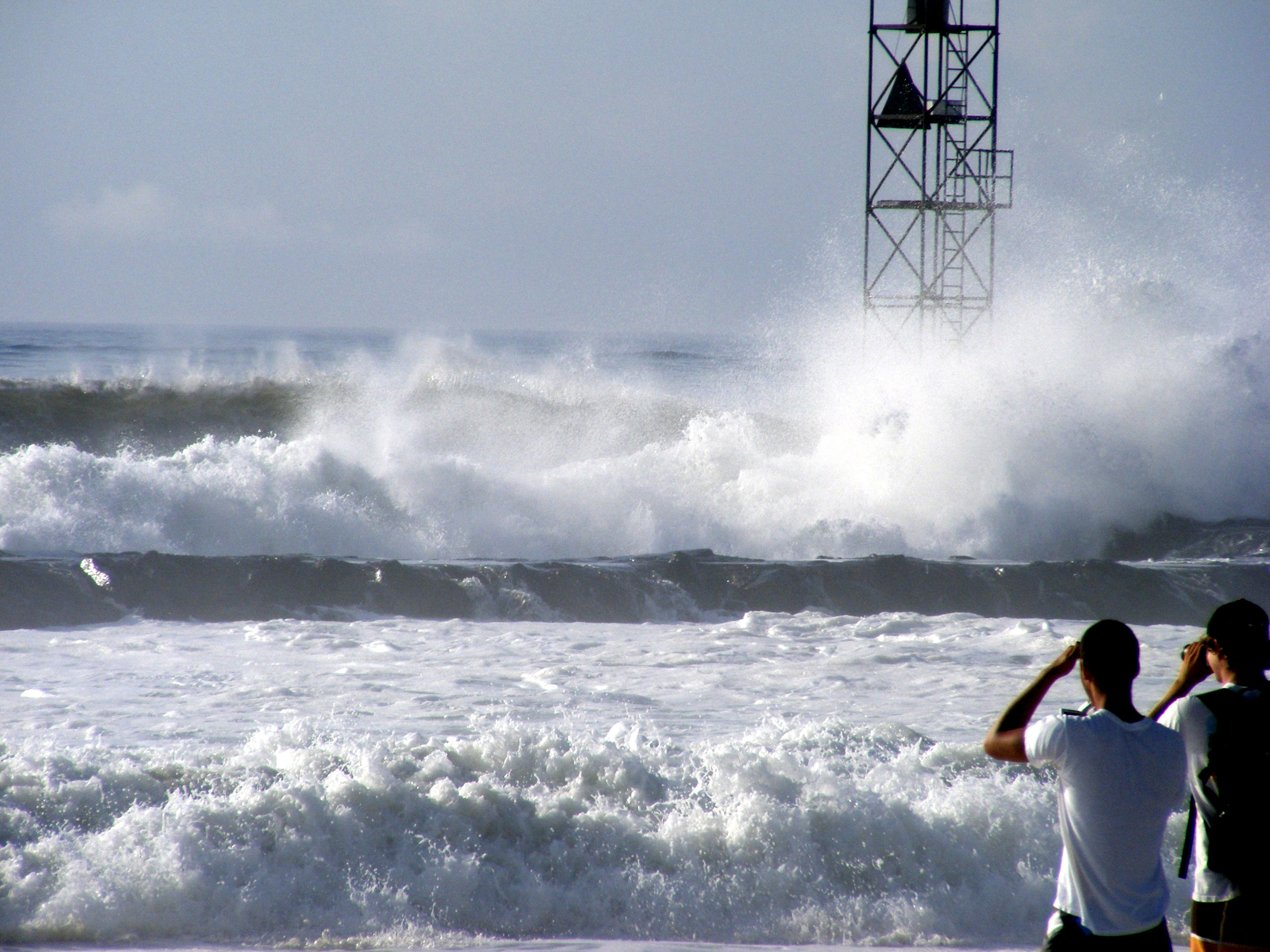
Waves from Hurricane Bill in New Jersey

- September 19, 2000 – The extratropical remnants of Hurricane Gordon passed over the state, dropping 2.11 in (54 mm) of rainfall near Somerville.
- June 17, 2001 – Subtropical Depression Allison passed just east of the state, causing gusty winds and up to 4.86 inches (12.3 cm) of rain.
- July 3, 2003 – A narrow F0 tornado briefly touched down in a marsh near Goshen, associated with the remnants of Tropical Storm Bill.
- September 13, 2003 – The remnants of Tropical Storm Henri dropped up to 3 inches (7.6 cm) of rain across the state.
- September 19, 2003 – Although Hurricane Isabel passed well to the southwest of the state, the hurricane's large windfield caused a storm surges of 10.6 feet (3.2 m) in Burlington. Outer bands of the storm resulted in light rainfall amounting to 1.3 inches (3.3 cm) in Wildwood, and wind gusts reached 61 mph (68 km) in nearby Cape May. Persistent strong waves severely erode beaches along the coast. Isabel caused 1 direct death and 1 indirect death, with damage amounting to $50 million (2003 USD).
- August 3, 2004 – Offshore Hurricane Alex dropped 3.81 in (97 mm) of rainfall in West Deptford Township.
- August 13, 2004 – Dissipating Tropical Depression Bonnie produced 0.65 in (17 mm) of rainfall in Folsom.
- August 14, 2004 – Shortly after the previous storm, former Hurricane Charley passed offshore the state, dropping 2.74 in (70 mm) of rainfall near Hewitt.
- August 31, 2004 – While Tropical Storm Gaston passed east of the state, New Lisbon recorded 3.94 in (100 mm).
- September 8, 2004 – As an extratropical cyclone, former Hurricane Frances dropped 5.25 in (133 mm) of rain in Trenton.
- September 17, 2004 – Former Hurricane Ivan dropped 5.5 inches (14 cm) of rain in Maplewood.
- September 28, 2004 – As an extratropical storm, former Hurricane Jeanne dropped 5 inches (13 cm) of rainfall across New Jersey.
- July 8, 2005 – The remnants of Hurricane Cindy knocked down a few trees and flooded roads, with a statewide rainfall maxima of 2.45 in (62 mm) near Pottersville.
- August 11–16, 2005 – Offshore Hurricane Irene caused rip currents and strong waves.
- August 30, 2005 — The remnants of Hurricane Katrina produced heavy rainfall and high winds, causing power outages and downed trees.
- September 7–8, 2005 – Rip currents from Hurricane Maria and Hurricane Nate killed one person and seriously injured another.
- June 15, 2006 – Tropical Storm Alberto passed to the southeast of the state, dropping 1.42 in (36 mm) of rainfall in Somerville.
- September 3, 2006 – The interaction between the remnants of Tropical Storm Ernesto and a strong high-pressure system produced intense wind gusts of up to 81 mph in Strathmere. The storm also dropped heavy rainfall reaching 5.05 in (128 mm) in Marlboro Township. The winds and rain downed trees and power lines, resulting in power outages.
- June 4, 2007 – The remnants of Tropical Storm Barry dropped 3.75 in (95 mm) of rainfall in Absecon.
- July 2008 – Offshore Hurricane Bertha produced rip currents that killed three surfers.
- September 6, 2008 – Tropical Storm Hanna passed through New Jersey, producing heavy rainfall and causing minor flooding.
- August 22, 2009 – Offshore Hurricane Bill lashed the coast with 10 ft (3.0 m) waves, causing beach erosion and several injuries.
- August 29, 2009 – The remnants of Tropical Storm Danny produced high waves, beach erosion, and rip currents that injured a surfer.

=== 2010s ===
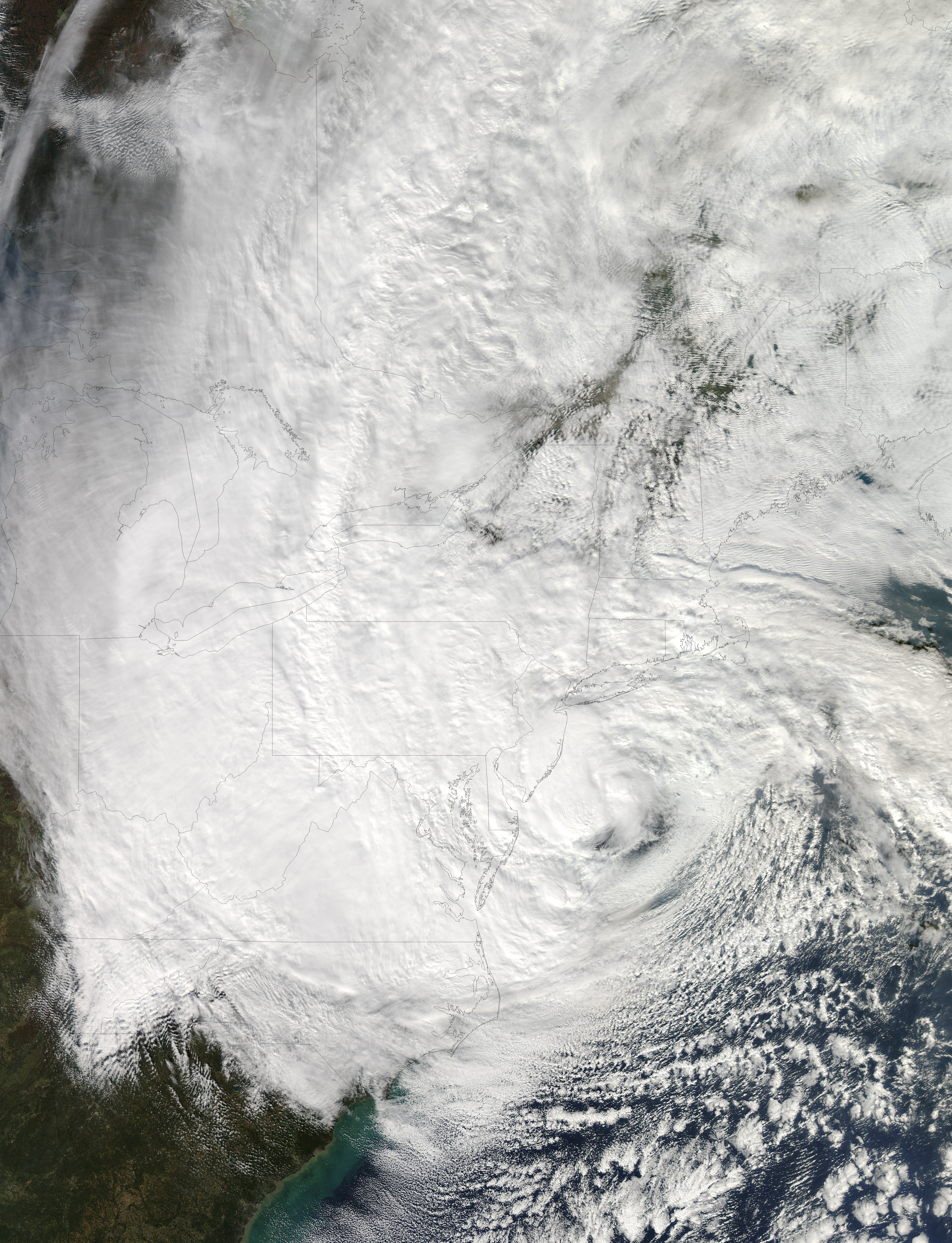
Hurricane Sandy travelling up the U.S. coastline on October 29

- September 3, 2010 – Rip currents from offshore Hurricane Earl killed two swimmers.
- September 20, 2010 – Offshore Hurricane Igor produced high waves and rip currents along the coast.
- September 30, 2010 – The remnants of Tropical Storm Nicole causing flooding rains from 4.79 in (122 mm) of precipitation in Parsippany.
- August 27–28, 2011 – Tropical Storm Irene made landfall in Brigantine as a strong tropical storm. The storm caused beach erosion, flooding, and sustained winds of 59 mph (95 km/h) in Cape May, where hurricane-force gusts were also recorded. Numerous reports of major flooding, downed trees, and power outages were reported. The storm caused the third ever shutdown of Atlantic City casinos and also prompted residents of coastal communities to evacuate in advance of the storm. The storm killed a total of ten people in the state.
- September 7–9, 2011 – The remnants of Tropical Storm Lee causes heavy rain across all of the state. In Phillipsburg, 9.55 in of rain fell. Moderate to severe flooding occurred in Western portions of the state.
- October 29–30, 2012 – Hurricane Sandy reached within 50 miles of the coastline before moving ashore in Brigantine as an extratropical cyclone. The storm brought hurricane-force winds, record low pressure, and a momentous storm surge along areas of the coast. The storm became the worst hurricane to affect the state on record, killing 37 and causing nearly $30 billion in damages. Widespread devastation is noted, particularly on Long Beach Island and the Barnegat Peninsula, where the Seaside Heights boardwalk collapses into the ocean. Further north, storm surge flooding caused massive destruction along the Raritan Bay and traps thousands in Hoboken. All of New Jersey Transit's commuter rail operations were affected, with some lines out of service for over a month, and inundation of rolling stock stored in NJ Transit's Meadowlands yard. Sandy also caused the worst power outage in state history, blacking out over 2 million households.
- June 7, 2013 – Tropical Storm Andrea passes through New Jersey as a post-tropical storm, causing heavy rainfall throughout the state and forcing an emergency plane landing at Newark Airport. Rainfall peaks at 5 inches in Oceanport.
- October 6, 2013 – Moisture associated with the remnants of Tropical Storm Karen drops locally heavy rains across New Jersey, causing minor street flooding.
- July 4, 2014 – Hurricane Arthur passes to the east of New Jersey. The storm produces moderate rainfall along the coast, though winds remain generally below tropical storm force. Strong waves buffet the coastline, and some holiday celebrations in the state were cancelled or postponed.
- August 28, 2014 – Hurricane Cristobal passes well offshore of the state but generates strong waves and rip currents that kill 2 in Sandy Hook.
- June 21, 2015 – The remnants of Tropical Storm Bill pass through the state, dropping heavy rain but causing no damage.
- October 1, 2015 – Hurricane Joaquin briefly threatens to approach or strike New Jersey, forcing the state to begin storm preparations. Officials in Atlantic City discuss the possibility of evacuations, though an order never materializes. Joaquin instead turns away long before affecting the shoreline.
- October 28, 2015 – The remnants of Hurricane Patricia pass through the Northeast. Heavy rain and gusty winds cause downed tree limbs, power outages, and flooding throughout the state.
- September 5, 2016 – Hurricane Hermine meanders off the coast as a powerful post-tropical cyclone. The state thoroughly prepares for the storm's arrival during the busy holiday weekend. Hermine moves further east than forecasted and impacts are much less than expected. Strong waves and minor coastal flooding occur along the coastline.
- October 8, 2016 – Hurricane Matthew interacts with a frontal system, bringing light rain to the state.
- June 24, 2017 – The remnants of Tropical Storm Cindy brought strong winds to portions of New Jersey. Numerous powerlines and trees were downed in parts of southern and central parts of New Jersey. Two EF-0 tornadoes related to the system touched down in Howell Township, the first one touching down in the Fort Plains area damaging a Home Depot, Chase Bank, a strip mall, an ice cream parlor and downing trees and powerlines. The second one hit a park in the Oak Glen area.
- September 3, 2017 – The remnants of Hurricane Harvey hit New Jersey on Labor Day weekend, causing minimal damage.
- September 19, 2017 – Large waves from Hurricane Jose cause beach erosion along the Jersey Shore. Moderate rainfall and winds of 25-40 mph also occur across the state.
- September 27, 2017 – Hurricane Maria brings showers and some gusty winds to the shore.
- October 29, 2017 – A post-tropical system that was once Tropical Storm Philippe passes east of the shore and brings 1–4 in of rain. The winds occasionally gusted over 40 mph and sustained winds were 15-30 mph.
- September 8–10, 2018 – The remnants of Tropical Storm Gordon affect the state for 3 days, dropping up to 3-6 inches in parts of the state, along with wind gusts reaching up to 40 mph.
- September 17, 2018 – The remnants of Hurricane Florence brought light to moderate rainfall to the state, with South Jersey receiving up to 3 in of rain.
- October 11–12, 2018 – The remnants of Hurricane Michael brought flash flooding to parts of Northern New Jersey.
- July 16–17, 2019 – Hurricane Barry's remnant moisture brought severe thunderstorms to the region. Trees were reported down and power outages occurred in Ewing, New Jersey.
- September 6, 2019 – Hurricane Dorian brought gusty winds and showers to the state, especially the shore. Winds as high as 45 mph were reported, along with light rainfall and foggy, cloudy conditions.

=== 2020s ===
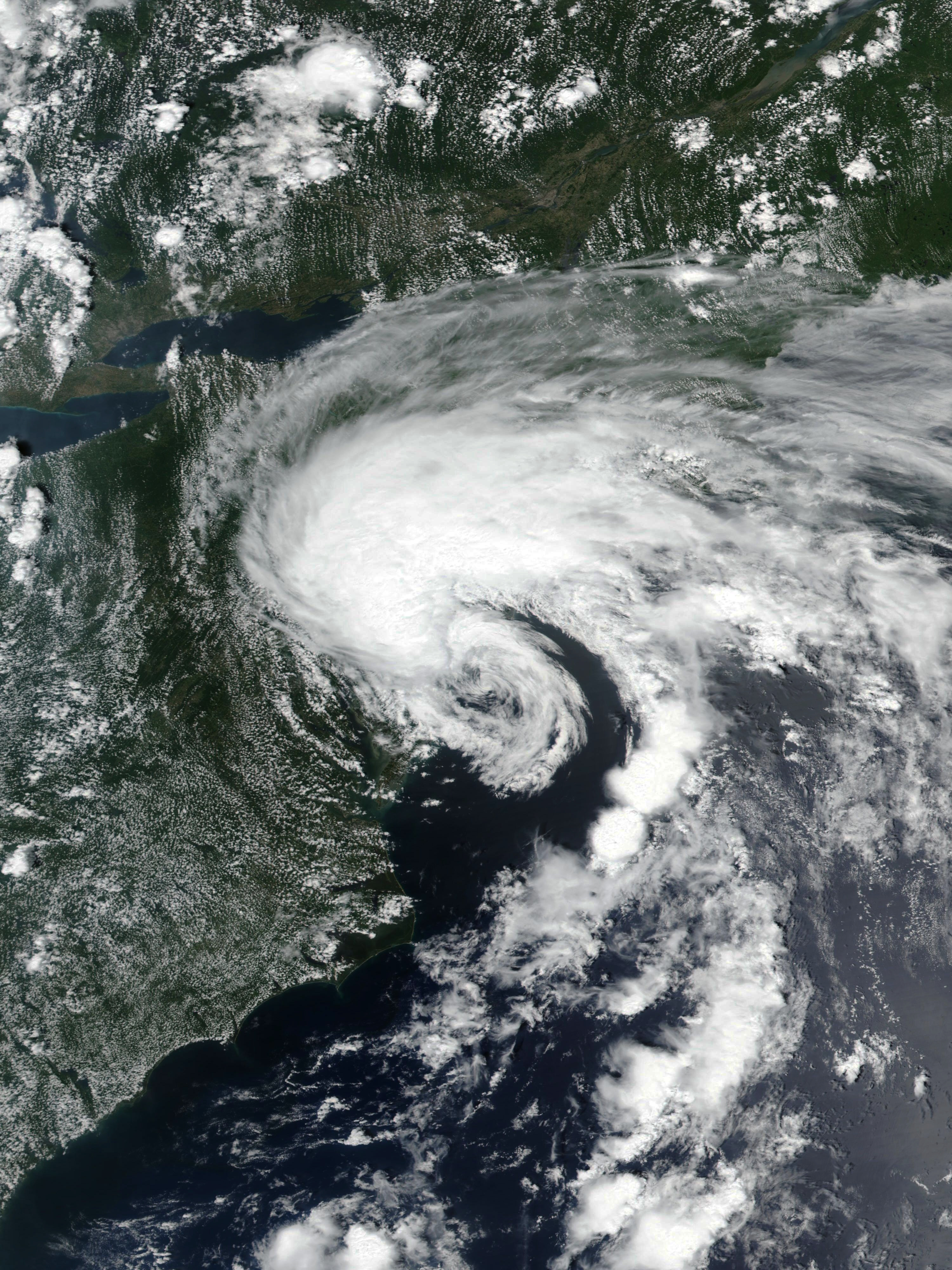
Satellite image of Tropical Storm Fay making landfall on July 10, 2020

- July 10, 2020 – Tropical Storm Fay made landfall just northeast of Atlantic City, New Jersey, with maximum sustained winds of 50 mph (80 km/h). Four people drowned due to rip currents along the coast. Fay was the first landfalling cyclone since Sandy in 2012 and the first fully tropical cyclone to make landfall in New Jersey since Irene in 2011.
- August 4, 2020 – Tropical Storm Isaias moved up the east coast of the United States, bringing wind gusts of 75 mph (120 km/h) to Cape May, as well as Berkeley Township. Rainfall reached 5.41 in (137 mm) in Logan Township. Governor Phil Murphy declared a state of emergency as 1.36 million people were reported without power throughout the state. Isaias spawned two tornadoes in the state. A 21-year-old man drowned off the coast of Cape May, New Jersey due to strong rip currents and rough surf.
- August 29, 2020 – Hurricane Laura's remnant energy brought 4.92 in (125 mm) of rainfall and 33 mph (53 km/h) wind gusts to the state.
- September 18–19, 2020 – Hurricane Sally's remnants brought 0.74 in (19 mm) of rainfall and 35 mph (56 km/h) wind gusts to the state.
- September 27–28, 2020 – Tropical Storm Beta's remnants brought 0.51 in (13 mm) of rainfall and 29 mph (47 km/h) wind gusts to the state.
- October 11–12, 2020 – Hurricane Delta's remnants affect New Jersey and surrounding states. A peak rainfall amount of 3.67 inches (93 mm) was recorded in West Creek, and a top wind gust of 42 miles per hour (68 km/h) was recorded in Sea Girt.
- October 29–31, 2020 – Post-Tropical Storm Zeta passes through the state, bringing high winds and heavy rainfall. A peak rainfall amount of 4.06 in (103 mm) and a wind gust of 45 mph (72 km/h) were recorded. A low pressure of 29.30 inches of mercury (992 mbar) was also recorded.
- July 8–9, 2021 – Tropical Storm Elsa moved up the east coast of the United States, bringing heavy rain and gusty winds to the state overnight through the morning of July 9. Elsa spawned two tornadoes in the state.
- August 16–20, 2021 – Tropical Storm Fred moved through the eastern United States, bringing rainfall to the northern portion of the state.
- August 21–24, 2021 – Tropical Storm Henri looped through New England, bringing heavy rainfall and flash flooding to northern New Jersey.
- September 1, 2021 – The remnants of Hurricane Ida hit New Jersey on September 1, bringing tornadoes and flash flooding, a rare tornado emergency was issued for the city of Trenton at the same time a flash flood emergency was also in effect for Trenton. As the remnants moved over more of the state, two more flash flood emergencies were issued for parts of the state, one for the Edison area, and another for the Elizabeth area. In total 23 people died in the state.
- September 18, 2021 – Rip currents from Tropical Storm Odette killed a surfer in Ocean County.
- October 27, 2021 – The precursor to Tropical Storm Wanda dropped heavy rainfall across the United States, causing one fatality in the state when a driver was struck by a fallen tree branch.
- September 8–10, 2022 – Swells from Hurricane Earl killed two people in the state.
- September 30–October 1, 2022 – The remnants of Hurricane Ian brought rainfall to the state before evolving into a nor'easter.
- November 11–12, 2022 – The remnants of Hurricane Nicole brought rainfall to the northern portion of the state.
- September 1–4, 2023 – Rip currents from Hurricane Franklin and the remnants of Hurricane Idalia killed three people along the state's coastline.
- September 14, 2023 – High waves from Hurricane Lee capsized a boat in Manasquan Inlet, killing one person.
- September 24, 2023 – The remnants of Tropical Storm Ophelia moved through the state, bringing heavy rainfall.
- August 17–19, 2024 - Hurricane Ernesto causes rough seas including rip currents across the Jersey Shore.
- September 27-29, 2024 - Hurricane Helene drops light rainfall and causes breezy conditions in the NYC metro. This would be the last measured precipitation in the region until November.
- July 7, 2025 - The remnants of Tropical Storm Chantal could cause flash flooding in portions of the state. Rain showers and possible thunderstorms are likely to hit the state from late July 7 into the evening and drop 1 to 2 inches (25 to 51 mm) of rain across a large swath of New Jersey, the National Weather Service said.
- August 21, 2025 - Hurricane Erin is passing offshore along the Jersey Shore on August 21 bringing strong winds and coastal flooding to parts of New Jersey.
- October 11, 2026 - The remnants of Hurricane Isaias could bring heavy rain, isolated flooding and thunderstorms to New Jersey.

== Climatological statistics ==
Tropical cyclones affect New Jersey the most during the month of September, though the state has experienced tropical cyclones throughout the hurricane season, excluding November. Storms affect the state most in September due to peak warmth in water temperatures. No recorded storm has affected the state between November and May except for Hurricanes Gordon and Nicole in November 1994 and 2022 respectively.

Number of recorded storms affecting New Jersey
Month	Number of storms
June	9
July	12
August	39
September	44
October	14
November	2

Storms affecting New Jersey by period
Period	Number of storms
1800s	23
1900–49	9
1950s	14
1960s	12
1970s	9
1980s	12
1990s	18
2000s	23
2010s	25
2020s	23

== Deadly storms ==
Most tropical cyclones that impact New Jersey only cause rainfall or strong waves, though a few have caused deaths in the state, including the following:

Name	Year	Number of deaths
Sandy	2012	37
Ida	2021	31
Unnamed	1806	21
Irene	2011	10
Unnamed	1944	9
Unnamed	1878	8
Connie	1955	6
Floyd	1999	6
Felix	1995	5
Fay	2020	4
Unnamed	1940	4
Diane	1955	3
Doria	1967	3
Doria	1971	3
Bertha	2008	3
Maria	2017	3
Idalia	2023	3
Unnamed	1933	2
Edouard	1996	2
Isabel	2003	2 (including 1 indirect)
Earl	2010	2
Cristobal	2014	2
Earl	2022	2
Isaias	2020	1 (including 1 indirect)
Barbara	1953	1
Gloria	1985	1
Gabrielle	1989	1
Danielle	1992	1
Bertha	1996	1
Paulette	2020	1
Teddy	2020	1
Maria and Nate	2005	1
Lee	2023	1
Donna	1960	1 (indirect)
Jose	2017	1

== Strongest storms ==
The following storms have caused hurricane-force winds in New Jersey:

Name	Saffir–Simpson Category	Date of closest approach	Year
Gale of 1878	1	October 23	1878
1903 New Jersey hurricane	1	September 16	1903
Unnamed	1	September 8	1934
1944 Great Atlantic hurricane	1	September 14	1944
Sandy	1	October 29	2012

== See also ==
- List of New England hurricanes
- Atlantic hurricane season
- List of Atlantic hurricanes
- Tropical cyclone
- List of New York hurricanes
