= 1903 New Jersey hurricane =

Category 2 Atlantic hurricane in 1903

Hurricane Four 1903 New Jersey hurricane Vagabond Hurricane
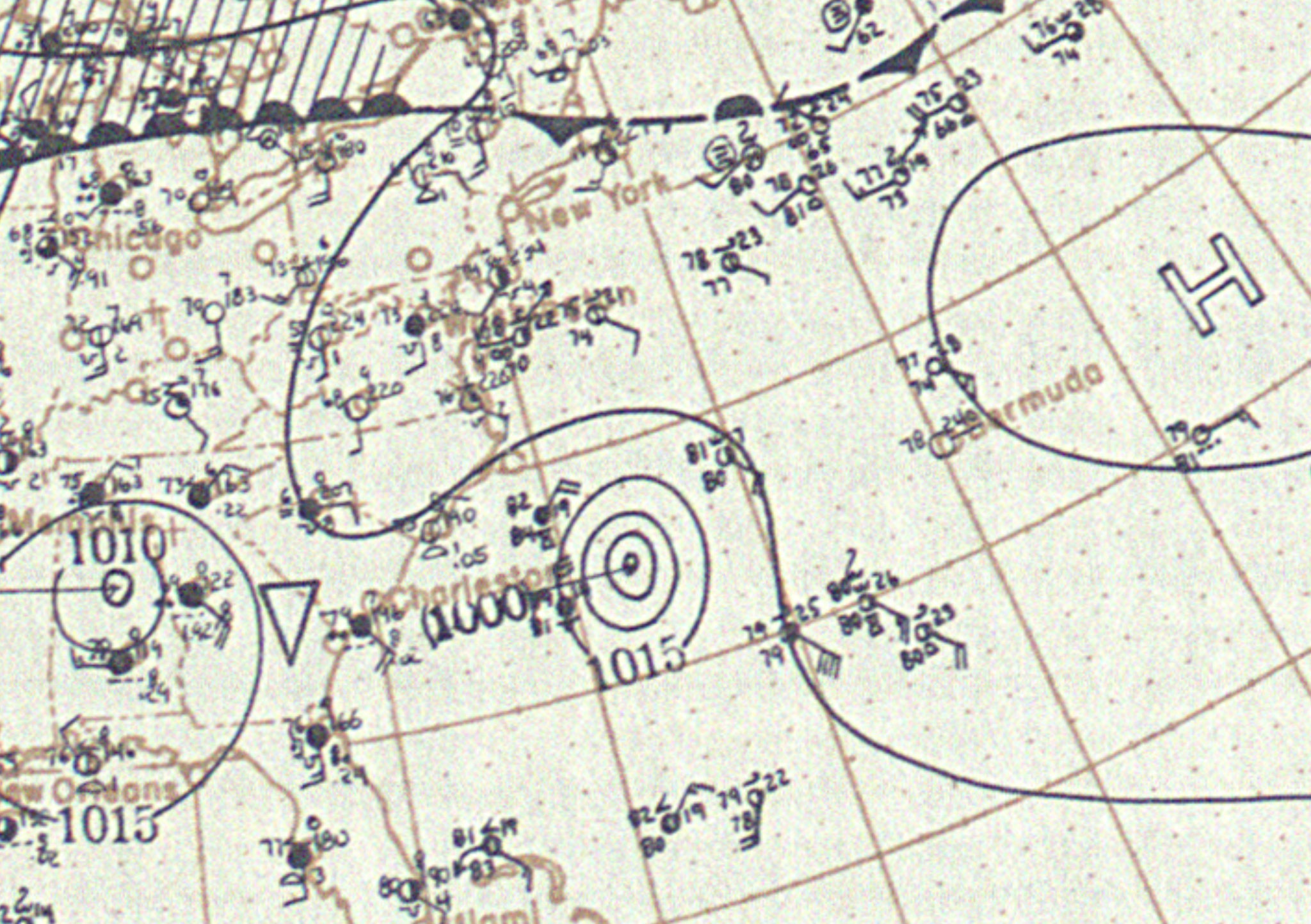
- Synoptic weather map of the hurricane near peak intensity just east of the U.S East Coast on September 15

Meteorological history
- Formed: September 12, 1903
- Dissipated: September 17, 1903

Category 2 hurricane
- 1-minute sustained (SSHWS/NWS)
- Highest winds: 100 mph (155 km/h)
- Lowest pressure: 990 mbar (hPa); 29.23 inHg

Overall effects
- Fatalities: 57 overall
- Damage: $8 million (1903 USD)
- Areas affected: Mid-Atlantic States, New Jersey, Pennsylvania, New York
- IBTrACS
- Part of the 1903 Atlantic hurricane season

The 1903 New Jersey hurricane, also known as the Vagabond Hurricane by The Press of Atlantic City, is the first and only known North Atlantic hurricane to make landfall in the state of New Jersey since records were kept starting in 1851. The fourth hurricane of the season, the cyclone was first observed on September 12 about 550 miles (890 kilometres) northeast of Antigua. It moved quickly westward, then later turned to the north-northwest, steadily strengthening to reach a peak intensity of 100 miles per hour (155 kilometres per hour), a Category 2 on the modern-day Saffir–Simpson scale. The hurricane weakened slightly before striking near Atlantic City, New Jersey, on September 16 with winds of 80 mph (130 km/h). It weakened over Pennsylvania and became an extratropical cyclone over western New York on September 17.

Rough surf and moderate winds from the hurricane capsized several ships along the East Coast of the United States; 30 people were left missing and presumed killed from a shipwreck in Chincoteague, Virginia. Along the coast, 57 people died due to the storm. In New Jersey, the hurricane caused heavy damage, particularly near the coast and in Atlantic City. Dozens of buildings were damaged or destroyed, and damage across the state totaled $8 million (1903 USD). In New York City, high winds disrupted traffic, closed businesses, and overturned wagons, with many windows and roofs damaged. On Long Island, President Theodore Roosevelt directly experienced the effects of the hurricane while on a yacht. The life of the president was briefly threatened by the rough conditions, though none on board the yacht suffered any problems from the hurricane.

== Meteorological history ==
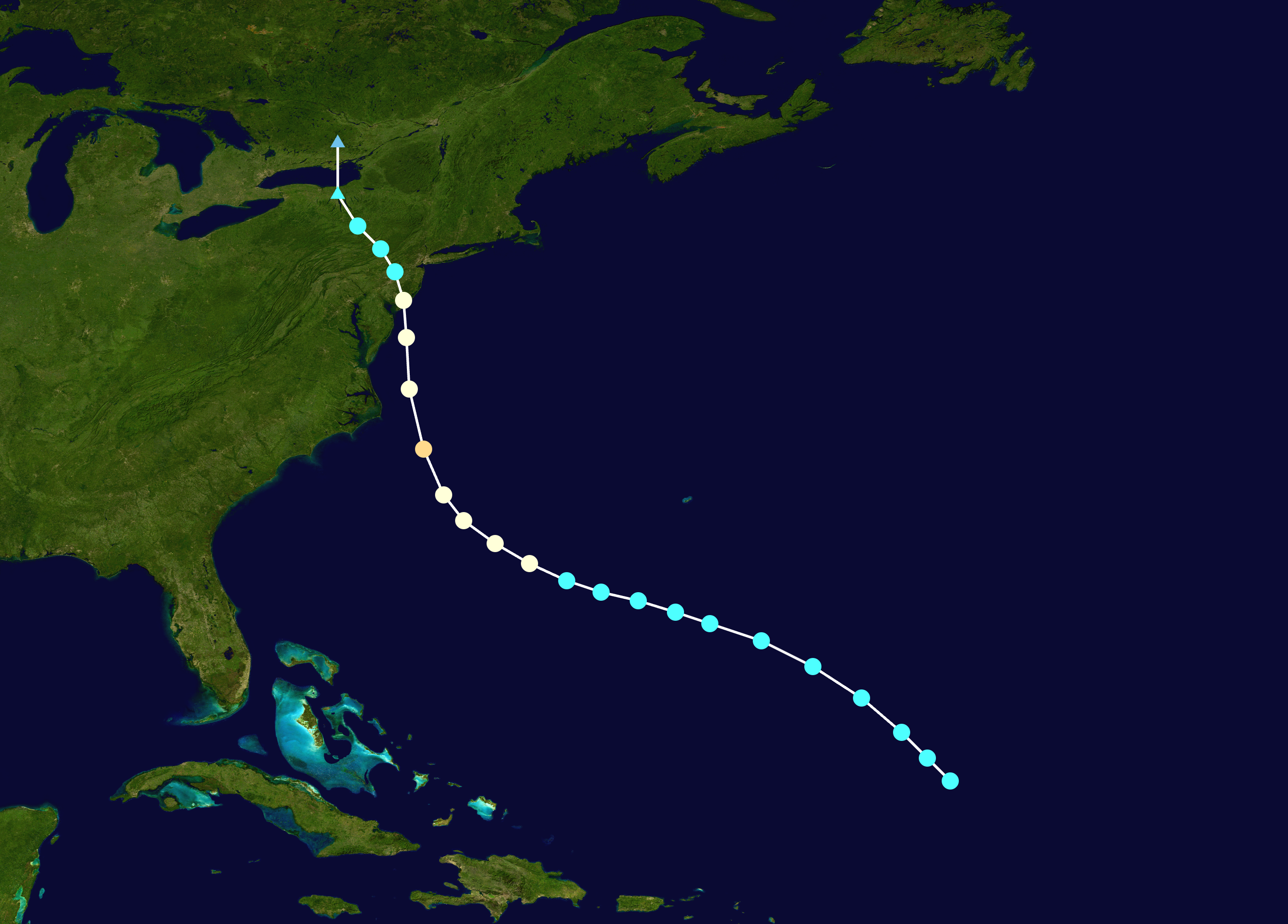
Map plotting the storm's track and intensity, according to the Saffir–Simpson scale Map key Saffir–Simpson scale Tropical depression (≤38 mph, ≤62 km/h) Tropical storm (39–73 mph, 63–118 km/h) Category 1 (74–95 mph, 119–153 km/h) Category 2 (96–110 mph, 154–177 km/h) Category 3 (111–129 mph, 178–208 km/h) Category 4 (130–156 mph, 209–251 km/h) Category 5 (≥157 mph, ≥252 km/h) Unknown Storm type Tropical cyclone Subtropical cyclone Extratropical cyclone, remnant low, tropical disturbance, or monsoon depression

The genesis of the storm is unknown; it was first observed on September 12 as a 70 mph (115 km/h) tropical storm about 550 miles (890 km) northeast of Antigua in the Lesser Antilles. On that day, the storm appeared on weather maps, and subsequently was tracked by ship reports as a small system. The storm tracked quickly northwestward, followed by a turn to the west-northwest. Around 18:00 UTC on September 13, the storm passed about 270 mi (435 km) south of Bermuda. Its exact track and intensity is unknown, though it is estimated the storm attained hurricane status late on September 14 about 360 mi (580 km) west-southwest of Bermuda. The hurricane steadily intensified as it curved northward, and attained an estimated peak intensity of 100 mph (160 km/h) late on September 15 about 110 mi (175 km) southeast of Cape Hatteras, North Carolina.

By late on September 15, the hurricane was beginning to affect the North Carolina coastline. The high winds near the center prompted the United States Weather Bureau to issue storm warnings on the morning of September 16 into the next day. Turning northward, the hurricane weakened slightly and made landfall near Atlantic City, New Jersey, shortly before 12:00 UTC on September 16. The estimated barometric pressure was 990 mbar (29 inHg), suggesting hurricane-force winds of 80 mph (130 km/h) at landfall.

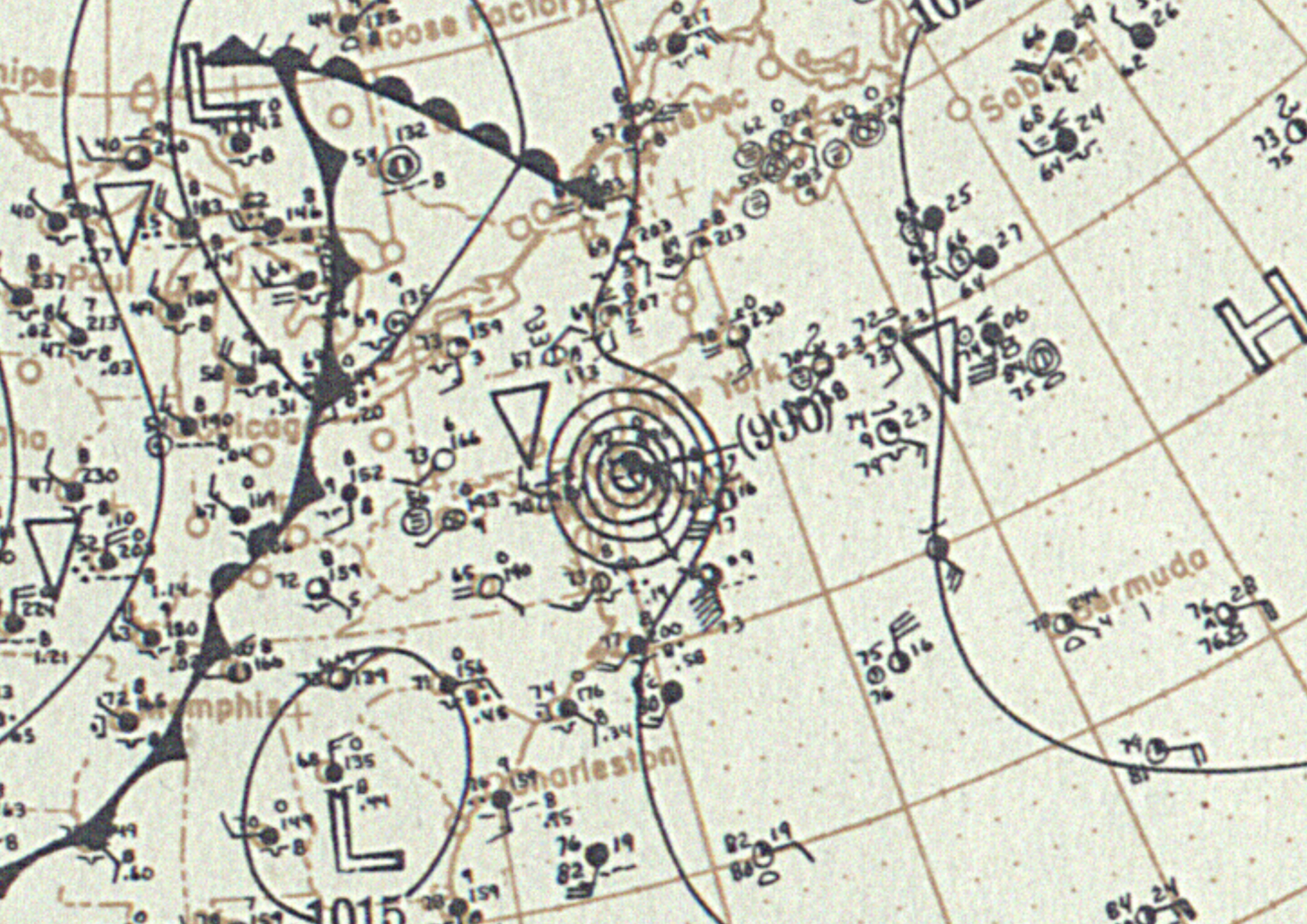
Weather map of the hurricane making landfall in New Jersey on September 16

This made it the first and only known hurricane to strike New Jersey since the Atlantic hurricane database's beginning in 1851. The storm structure broadened after landfall, and the Weather Bureau assessed one center splitting off and tracking north-northeastward into New York and Connecticut. The main center continued northwestward, weakening into a tropical storm near Trenton, New Jersey. After crossing northeastern Pennsylvania, the system transitioned into an extratropical cyclone near Syracuse, New York on September 17. The extratropical remnant persisted for another six hours before losing its identity over eastern Ontario.

== Impact ==
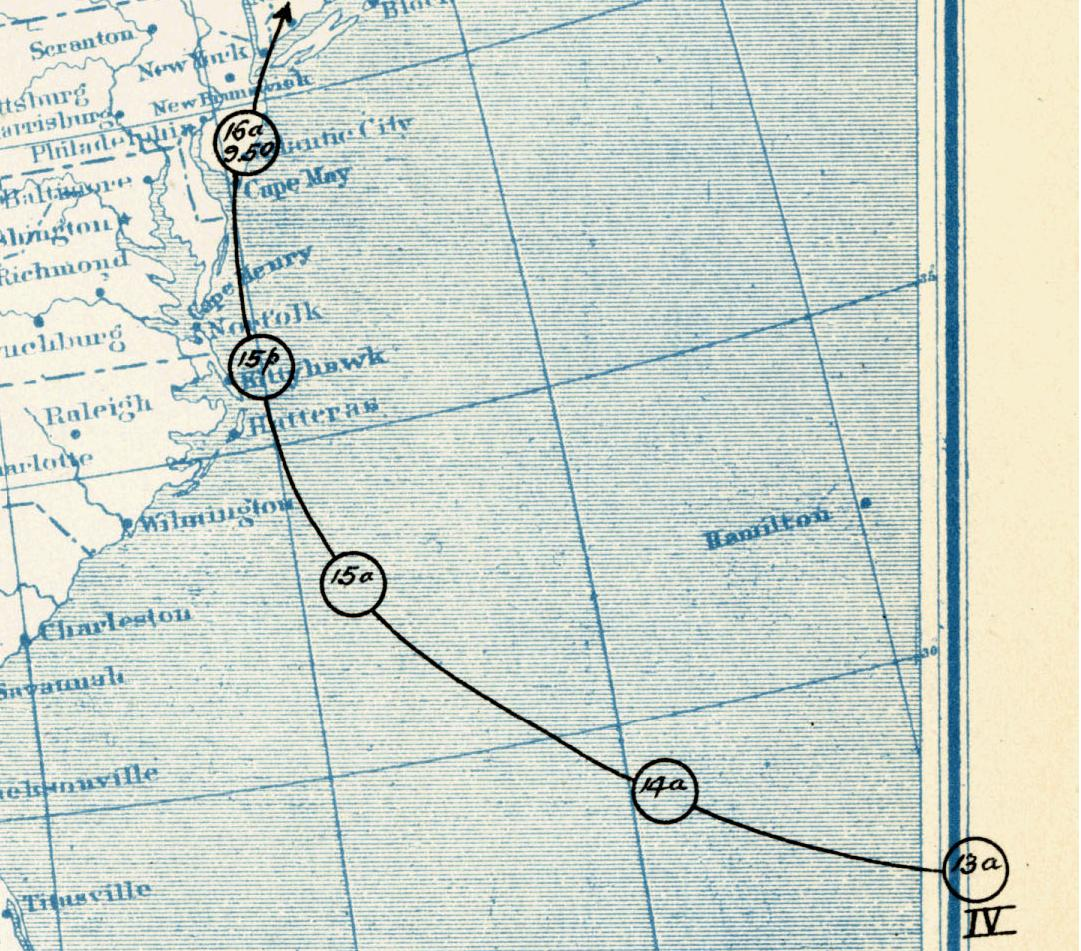
Operational track of the hurricane

Overall, the hurricane killed 57 people during its passage through the Mid-Atlantic states. Winds of over 60 mph (97 km/h) affected large portions of the coastline from New Jersey to southern New England.

The hurricane first brought rainfall to coastal parts of Georgia and South Carolina. Strong winds were reported along coastal areas of North Carolina, with sustained winds peaking at 72 mph (116 km/h) at Kitty Hawk. Winds reached 54 mph (87 km/h) at Cape Henry, Virginia, and the combination of the winds and rough surf washed some boats ashore. The schooner Beatrice was lost near Chincoteague with a crew of 30; 28 people on board were killed. A squall line destroyed the front mast of a schooner near Cape Henry. Several boats broke free from their moorings near Salisbury and were subsequently destroyed after passing downstream. The schooner Hattie A. Marsh encountered strong winds from the hurricane along the Delaware coast, while strong waves washed it ashore the rocky coastline. The boat was wrecked and the rooms on board were washed overboard, killing five members of the crew. Two people were rescued after conditions calmed, one of whom was injured and taken to a hospital.

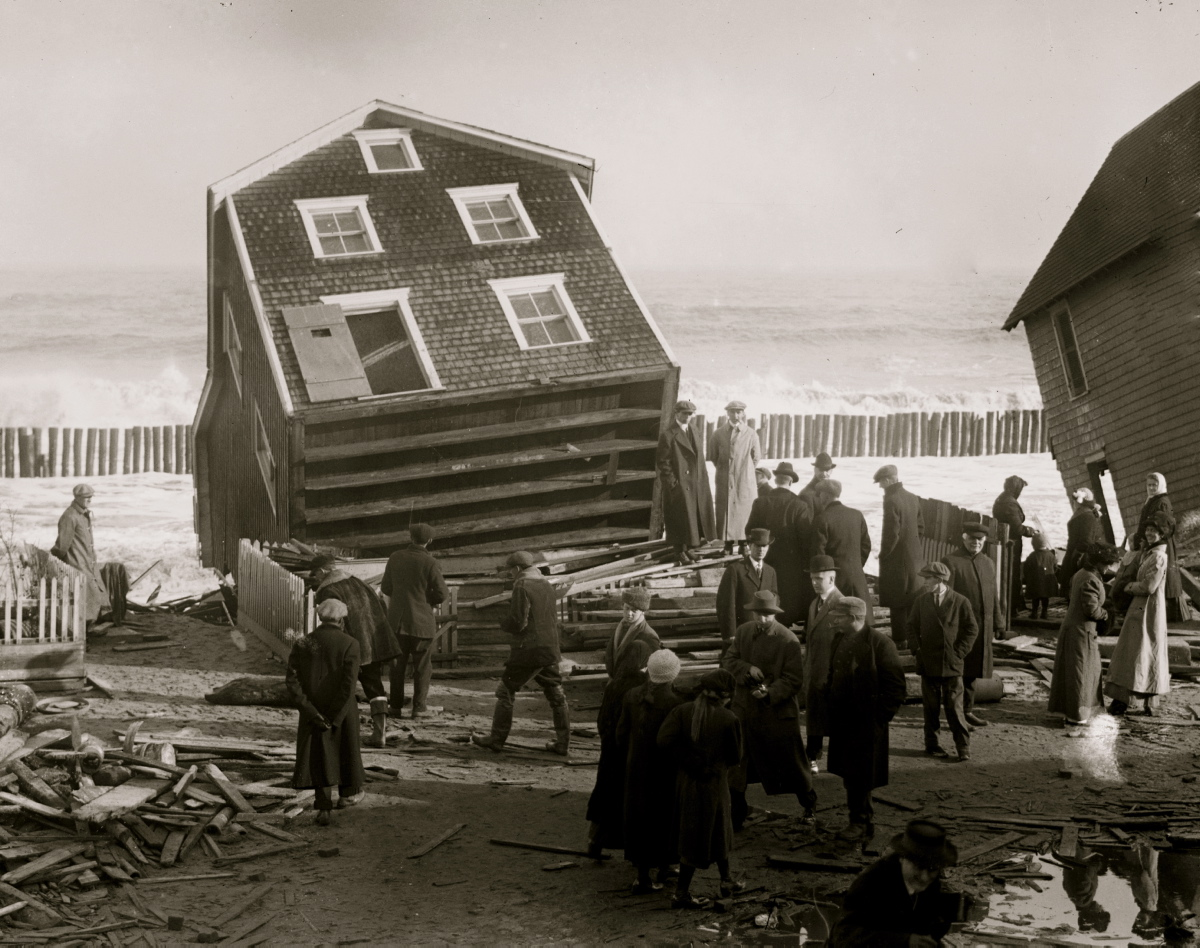
House damage from the hurricane in Sea Bright, New Jersey

A flock of birds encountered the hurricane over eastern Virginia; hundreds of birds were killed and fell to the ground near Old Point Comfort, many stripped of their feathers. The outer rainbands of the storm produced heavy amounts of precipitation near Washington, D.C., canceling a baseball game between the Detroit Tigers and the Washington Senators after the field was flooded. In Ocean City, Maryland, the hurricane was considered the worst in 40 years. The hurricane produced 80 mph (130 km/h) winds and rough waves along the Delaware Capes, indicating hurricane-force winds affected the state. It was one of only two storms on record to produce such winds in the state. Three barges and a steamer capsized in the Delaware Bay, while onshore, the winds of the hurricane destroyed the roofs of four houses in Laurel. The winds downed many trees and destroyed several chimneys near Lewes. In Philadelphia, Pennsylvania, winds reached 45 mph (72 km/h), which damaged telegraph and phone lines, knocked down several trees, and damaged the roof of Pennsylvania Railroad's Broad Street Station.

Described by the Weather Bureau as "a most unusual tempest," the storm was one of only four to produce hurricane-force winds in New Jersey. The storm's strong surf destroyed several boats along the coastline, including 34 in Waretown. Less than 10% of the people in Atlantic City evacuated, and after the storm, many people visited the city to observe the storm damage described in newspapers. High winds disrupted 800 telephone lines in Atlantic City, and most communications were cut from the Jersey Shore to the Philadelphia region. Initial damage reports were provided by trains, although there were severe transportation delays due to ongoing flooding. The disrupted communications sparked "wild rumors that the great resort had been entirely washed away," according to The New York Times. Monetary damage in Atlantic City was estimated around $1 million (1903 USD). Atlantic City's power was deliberately shut off to prevent accidents. In the city, the roof of one hotel and the porch of another were destroyed. Trees and awnings were damaged, and thousands of windows were damaged. The winds destroyed the roofs of an estimated 50 to 60 cottages. The surf damaged or destroyed most fishing piers and oceanfront pavilions in the Atlantic City area, with tons of debris dispersed across the beach. The strong winds, combined with heavy rainfall, resulted in one indirect fatality when a man, unable to see owing to the hurricane, drove into a train in Cape May. In Asbury Park, the storm wrecked the roofs of six hotels. High waves damaged the boardwalks at Belmar and Allenhurst. High winds heavily damaged fruit crops in Monmouth, Middlesex, and Hunterdon counties. Fruit trees were uprooted in Vineland, and in Flemington, about 75% of apples and pears were lost. Damage across the state was estimated at $8 million (1903 USD); the worst of the damage occurred in Atlantic City, though moderate damage extended from Cape May northward through Asbury Park.

More havoc was caused by yesterday's big storm than has been caused by any other storm in recent years.

— The New York Times

In New York, the outer periphery of the storm produced 2.4 inches (61 mm) of rain in Central Park, where dozens of trees were knocked down or damaged. High tides peaked at 6.4 ft (2.0 m), which inundated Battery Park and made ferry passage difficult. Winds in New York City reached 65 mph (105 km/h), reaching 70 mph (110 km/h) along the coast, with tropical storm force winds extending into Maine. The winds were the strongest in the city since August 1889, lasting about four hours at its peak. Funneled by the streets and tall buildings of New York, the high winds swayed buildings, spires, and bridges, overturning wagons on the Brooklyn Bridge. The shape of the Flatiron Building tossed horse-drawn carriages, and two people were injured when a wagon of furniture was overturned. The rains and winds knocked down signs and awnings while wrecking dozens of windows, chimneys, and roofs, causing residents to evacuate buildings and damaging several storefronts. One woman was hospitalized after being struck by an airborne sign. The high amount of damage led to the greatest number of inspectors of the New York City Department of Buildings to determine which buildings were safe. In Brighton Beach, the roof of the Ocean Hotel was completely blown off, and a similar fate befell the top of the Steeplechase Tower in Coney Island resort area, which sustained considerable damage. In Brooklyn, church steeples were dislodged or blown off, and many homes in the borough were flooded or damaged. Construction work on the Williamsburg Bridge was halted during the storm. On Staten Island, the winds blew off the roof of a school. The hurricane also left businesses and the stock market quiet for the day, owing to the threat of blowing debris. Trees and signs were blown down in the New York suburbs. One person died in New York City due to the storm.

The high waves and winds caused the greatest marine damage in a decade around New York City. More than 100 boats were overturned or beached in Jamaica Bay, and another 150 boats were wrecked between Hell Gate and the west end of Coney Island. At least ten houseboats were damaged or sank, with boaters injured and requiring rescue. A man attempting to row ashore near Point O' Woods required rescue amid strong winds. Passengers swam safely ashore after their boat capsized in Hell Gate. President Theodore Roosevelt directly experienced the effects of the hurricane while vacationing on the naval yacht Sylph along Long Island. Also on the yacht were Roosvelt's wife, son, his secretary, several friends and members of the press association. The yacht experienced gusty winds and heavy rainfall, along with rough seas, and witnessed a boat capsizing in Hell Gate. Passengers left the deck of the yacht for safety while their belongings were secured. After the President was considered to be in danger, the yacht headed for land, and instead of embarking toward Ellis Island as originally planned, the yacht landed at Brooklyn Navy Yard. Farther north, high winds downed many trees along coastal Connecticut, which cut telegraph and telephone lines in Bridgeport. A boy was killed in Hartford after stepping onto a downed power line. Several boats were washed ashore along the Connecticut coast. Farther inland, winds disrupted power in Leicester and damaged crops.

== See also ==
- List of New Jersey hurricanes
  - 1821 Norfolk and Long Island hurricane – powerful hurricane that affected the east coast of the United States in 1821
  - Hurricane Irene – struck just northeast of Atlantic City in 2011
  - Hurricane Sandy – struck just northeast of Atlantic City in 2012 as an extratropical cyclone, becoming the second-costliest storm on record at the time in the United States
- List of Delaware hurricanes
