= Crystal Díaz Rojas =

Puerto Rican tech entrepreneur

Personal details
- Born: Manatí, Puerto Rico
- Education: Universidad de Puerto Rico en Río Piedras; B.A. Business with a specialty in Marketing and a minor in Advertising. M.A. in Management and Cultural Administration at University of Puerto Rico. M.A. in Food Studies at New York University.
- Awards: Fast Company's Most Creative People in Business in 2022.

Crystal Díaz Rojas is a Puerto Rican entrepreneur with over 22 years of experience in food businesses, sustainable tourism and marketing.

== Education ==
Crystal Díaz Rojas graduated from the University of Puerto Rico in Río Piedras with a bachelor's degree in business with a specialty in Marketing, and a minor in Advertising. She went on to graduate with a master's degree in Management and Cultural Administration. She completed a second master's degree in Food Studies as NYU Steinhardt focused in Food Policy and Advocacy.

== Career ==
Díaz Rojas opened El Pretexto in June 2018, a farm lodge located in Puerto Rico's Cayey Mountains. It is the island's first culinary farm lodge, promoting ecological sustainability, combining rustic, artistic, and modern elements. The property incorporates native plants, an agroecological garden, and a fruit forest.

Díaz Rojas is co-founder of the grocery-delivery marketplace PRoduce, founded in February 2018 after Hurricane Maria devastated the country and depleted its food supplies. The hurricane motivated Díaz Rojas, highlighting the urgency to create a platform that connects local food producers with consumers and preserves local food chains. It aims to reduce Puerto Rico’s reliance on imported commodities. It seeks to link consumers and professional chefs with access to locally sourced vegetables, fruits, meats, and other goods that are typically not sold in grocery stores on the island. Puerto Rico heavily relies on food imports, with over 90% of its food being imported, and the app seeks to address this issue by connecting small producers with consumers. In 2020, Hurricane Isaías further disrupted Puerto Rico's food production, wiping out the entire plantain crop—a crucial ingredient in Puerto Rican cuisine. PRoduce purchased over 10,000 plantains from 15 producers, and sold them to locals at an affordable price, supporting the islanders' daily diet and culinary traditions. With the increasing frequency and intensity of hurricanes linked to climate change, Díaz Rojas emphasizes the need to adapt and prepare for such challenges. Today, PRoduce has over 80,000 users and collaborates with more than 400 local producers. The app has experienced a 1500% increase in users during the pandemic.

Currently, Díaz Rojas collaborates with Espacios Abiertos as a Food Security Coordinator. She also is a partner at Sips+Bites, a boutique marketing agency specialized in food and beverage brands.

The James Beard Foundation acknowledged PRoduce as one of 12 leadership and resilience projects in its 2021 awards edition. PRoduce's headquarters are located in San Juan, Puerto Rico. Díaz Rojas has participated in the Women's Entrepreneurial Leadership Program of The James Beard Foundation in 2022 and the Stanford Latino Entrepreneurship Initiative-Education Program supported by LBAN in 2021.

Previously, Díaz Rojas had roles in World Central Kitchen as the Food Producer Network and Communications Manager for Puerto Rico and USVI. She also performed as Cincosentidos Culinary Group's Marketing Director, and started her professional career in GFR Media, Puerto Rico's largest media company. For 14 years, she performed several roles including Marketing and Audience Development Strategist and associate director of Experiential Marketing and Distribution.

== Awards and recognition ==
Díaz Rojas' work through PRoduce, promoting locally sourced food, and supporting Puerto Rico's agricultural sector have earned her recognition as one of Fast Company's Most Creative People in Business in 2022.
