= Tropical Storm Doria =

Atlantic tropical storm in 1971

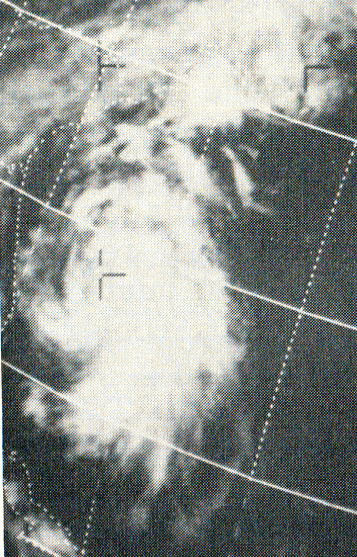
- Satellite image of Doria east of Florida

Meteorological history
- Formed: August 20, 1971
- Dissipated: August 29, 1971

Tropical storm
- 1-minute sustained (SSHWS/NWS)
- Highest winds: 65 mph (100 km/h)
- Lowest pressure: 989 mbar (hPa); 29.21 inHg

Overall effects
- Fatalities: 7 direct
- Damage: $148 million (1971 USD)
- Areas affected: East Coast of the United States, Canada
- IBTrACS
- Part of the 1971 Atlantic hurricane season

Tropical Storm Doria was the costliest tropical cyclone in the 1971 Atlantic hurricane season. The fifth tropical storm of the season, Doria developed from a tropical wave on August 20 to the east of the Lesser Antilles, and after five days without development it attained tropical storm status to the east of Florida. Doria turned to the north, and reached peak winds of 65 mph (105 km/h) as it was making landfall near Morehead City, North Carolina. It turned to the northeast, and moved through the Mid-Atlantic and New England as a tropical storm before becoming an extratropical storm over Maine on August 29.

In North Carolina, Doria produced moderate rainfall, resulting in localized flooding and damage. The storm spawned a tornado near Norfolk, Virginia, damaging twelve houses and downing hundreds of trees. Tropical Storm Doria dropped heavy precipitation in New Jersey, peaking at 10.29 inches (261 mm) in Little Falls. The rainfall led to record-breaking river levels and flooding in several houses, resulting in damage to dozens of houses across the state. Moderate damage and rainfall continued along its path into New England and southeastern Canada. In all, Tropical Storm Doria caused seven deaths and $147.6 million (1971 USD, $1.17 billion 2026 USD).

== Meteorological history ==
Map plotting the storm's track and intensity, according to the Saffir–Simpson scale Map key Saffir–Simpson scale Tropical depression (≤38 mph, ≤62 km/h) Tropical storm (39–73 mph, 63–118 km/h) Category 1 (74–95 mph, 119–153 km/h) Category 2 (96–110 mph, 154–177 km/h) Category 3 (111–129 mph, 178–208 km/h) Category 4 (130–156 mph, 209–251 km/h) Category 5 (≥157 mph, ≥252 km/h) Unknown Storm type Tropical cyclone Subtropical cyclone Extratropical cyclone, remnant low, tropical disturbance, or monsoon depression

On August 15, a tropical wave moved off the coast of Africa, and tracked westward while slowly organizing. On August 20, subsequent to the development of a low-level circulation, an area of convection along the wave developed into a tropical depression while located about 1,000 miles (1,600 km) east-northeast of Grenada. Initially failing to organize further, the depression moved to the west-northwest, and on August 23, it passed through the northern Lesser Antilles. The depression moved to the north of Puerto Rico, Hispaniola, and the Bahamas, and began to show further signs of organization on August 25. After briefly weakening on August 26, the depression re-strengthened while turning to the north, and attained tropical storm status on August 27 while located 230 miles (370 km) east of Daytona Beach, Florida.

After reaching tropical storm status, Doria quickly intensified as its wind field expanded while moving northward. The minimum central pressure quickly dropped, as well, and late on August 27, Doria reached its peak intensity of 65 mph (105 km/h) while making landfall on North Carolina near Morehead City. The storm maintained its peak winds as it moved north-northeastward through North Carolina, and weakened slightly to a 60 mph (97 km/h) tropical storm after entering Virginia on August 28. Doria turned to the northeast, passing through the Chesapeake Bay and Delmarva Peninsula before entering southern New Jersey. It paralleled the state a short distance inland, and after moving through New York City Doria became extratropical over northwestern Maine on August 29. The extratropical remnant continued northeastward until losing its identity near the border of New Brunswick and Quebec in Canada.

== Impact ==
=== Southeast United States and Virginia ===
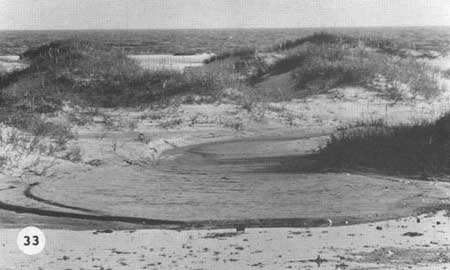
Beach erosion in North Carolina from Doria

Doria passed near or through the northern Caribbean Islands and the Bahamas as a tropical depression, though effects, if any, are unknown. Tropical Storm Doria passed about 160 miles (260 km) east of Charleston, South Carolina, though its large wind field produced 22 mph (35 km/h) winds in the town. The storm also dropped light rainfall of up to 1.75 inches (44 mm), and resulted in a storm tide of 5.7 feet (1.7 m) above the mean low water level.

Upon making landfall in North Carolina, Doria produced a storm tide of 2 feet (0.61 m) above normal at Cape Fear. Sustained winds in the state peaked at 41 mph (66 km/h) in Hatteras, while gusts reached 69 mph (111 km/h) in Atlantic Beach. In most areas, wind damage was minimal. Tropical Storm Doria dropped moderate rainfall across the state, including a report of 4.17 inches (106 mm) in Cape Hatteras. Over 5 inches (130 mm) of rain fell around the Albemarle Sound and near New Bern. The rainfall led to flooding and mudslides, which blocked roads and highways. In localized areas, the flooding caused severe damage to roads and houses. Flooding from Doria also damaged water and sewage systems. Rainfall in the state persisted for two weeks after the passage of Doria.

In Virginia, the storm produced a storm tide of 3.6 feet (1.1 m) above normal in Norfolk. Sustained winds peaked at 60 mph (97 km/h) in Langley Air Force Base, while gusts reached 71 mph (114 km/h) in Norfolk. The bands of the storm spawned an F1 tornado near Portsmouth and Chesapeake, damaging twelve homes and downing hundreds of trees. Damage from the tornado amounted to $250,000 (1971 USD$, 1.99 million 2026 USD). Rainfall from Doria was moderate, peaking at 6.44 inches (164 mm) at a location 2 miles (3.2 km) south-southeast of Halifax. One person drowned in Alexandria when she fell into a draining ditch. The storm severely damaged a large warehouse in Norfolk, as well. Damage in Virginia totaled $375,000 (1971 USD$, 2.98 million 2026 USD). Floodwaters from Doria clogged sewage systems near Norfolk, Virginia with sand and silt. This forced the sewage to be dumped into the Chesapeake Bay, resulting in the closure of several beaches for days.

=== Mid-Atlantic states ===
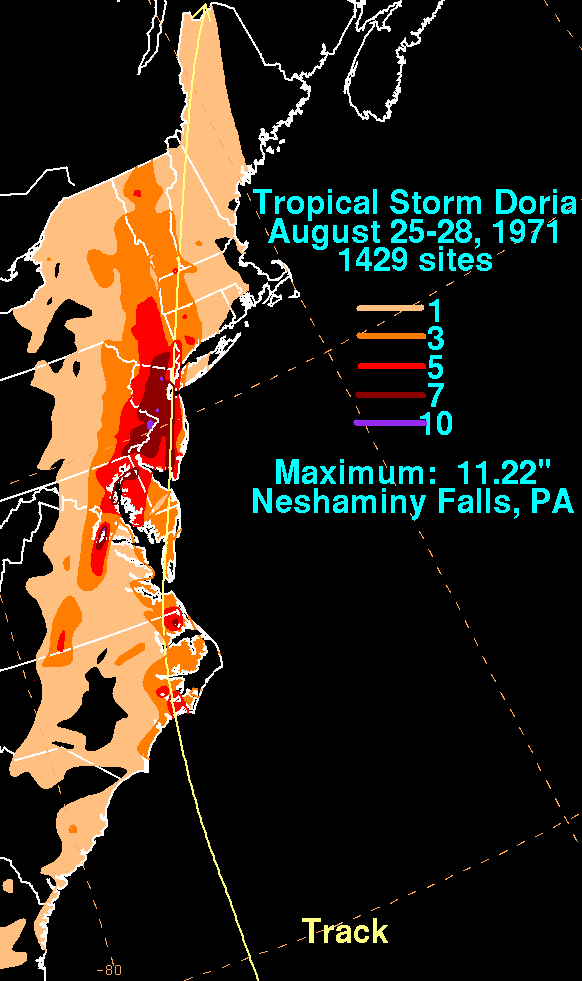
Rainfall totals from Doria

Tropical Storm Doria dropped 3.85 inches (98 mm) of rain in Washington National Airport in Washington, D.C. In Maryland, the storm resulted in tides 2.7 feet (0.82 m) above normal in Fort McHenry. Rainfall in the state peaked at 4.39 inches (112 mm) in Baltimore, while wind gusts reached a maximum of 63 mph (101 km/h) at the United States Coast Guard station in Ocean City. The storm produced 5.09 inches (129 mm) of rain in Wilmington, Delaware and a storm tide of 3.2 feet (0.98 m) above normal in Lewes. In Pennsylvania, the passage of Tropical Storm Doria resulted in 6.57 inches (167 mm) of rain and peak wind gusts of 73 mph (117 km/h) in Philadelphia. Moderate winds downed trees and power lines in Pennsylvania, and one person died in the state. Several rivers in the southeastern portion of the state experienced record-breaking flooding.

In New Jersey, Doria produced wind gusts of up to 54 mph (87 km/h) and storm tides 5.3 feet (1.6 m) above normal in Atlantic City. The outer bands of the storm spawned an F2 tornado near Cape May. It moved quickly northward through Cape May County, and caused about $250,000 in damage (1971 USD$, 1.99 million 2026 USD) in damage along its 29-mile (47 km) path. The storm dropped heavy rainfall, peaking at 10.29 inches (261 mm) in Little Falls. Record 24-hour rainfall totals occurred in Newark with 7.84 inches (199 mm) and Trenton with 7.55 inches (192 mm). The rainfall led to record flooding on several small streams in the state. The Beden Brook crested at over 5 feet (1.5 m) above normal, which destroyed a bridge near Princeton. The Raritan River at Manville crested at 9.8 feet (3.0 m), a record that stood until the passage of Hurricane Floyd in 1999. The heavy rainfall overtopped the levee system in Zarephath, causing severe damage to the Alma White College and preventing it from opening in the fall of 1971. The rainfall also flooded two fire houses in Somerville with several feet of water, and the water treatment plant in Bridgewater Township with 18 inches (460 mm) of floodwaters in what was catalogued as a 50-year flood event. Following the flooding to the water treatment plant, officials raised the beams of the plant to withstand a 500-year flood event. Eleven houses experienced flooding damage in Montgomery Township. The storm also severed the New York, Susquehanna and Western Railroad for years by washing out the line in Kinnelon at Smoke Rise. Doria killed three people and caused $138 million in damage (1971 USD) in the state.

=== Northeast United States and Canada ===
Tropical Storm Doria produced moderate winds in New York City with gusts to 48 mph (77 km/h). The storm tide reached 3.8 feet (1.2 m) above normal at Battery Park, and rainfall peaked at 5.96 inches (151 mm). LaGuardia Airport recorded 2.29 inches (58 mm) of rain in a one-hour period. The threat of the storm cancelled a baseball game between the Los Angeles Dodgers and the New York Mets. Heavy rainfall flooded streets and subways in New York. In Connecticut, Doria produced up to 3.12 inches (79 mm) of rain and wind gusts peaking at 48 mph (77 km/h) in Hartford. Doria dropped light rain in Rhode Island, including a report of 0.97 inches (25 mm) in Providence. The storm also produced wind gusts of up to 61 mph (98 km/h) and a storm tide of 5.9 feet (1.8 m) above mean water level. In Boston, rainfall totaled to 0.83 inches (21 mm), while wind gusts peaked at 80 mph (130 km/h) at the Blue Hill Meteorological Observatory. Two people drowned in Marblehead when they were swept away by surf from the storm.

The storm dropped moderate rainfall in Vermont, including a total of 5.73 inches (146 mm) in Mays Mill. The rainfall caused road washouts, landslides, and damage to bridges in the southeast portion of the state. The center of Tropical Storm Doria passed over south-central New Hampshire, resulting in heavy rains and damaging winds. Sustained winds in Maine were generally around 30 mph (48 km/h), while gusts peaked at 61 mph (98 km/h) in Lewiston. The strong winds resulted in downed trees and widespread outages to power and telephone service. The winds also damaged a mobile home in Sabattus and a steel shed in Lewiston. Doria produced moderate rainfall, including a total of 1.75 inches (44 mm) in Lewiston, though little flooding occurred.

Moisture from Tropical Storm Doria entered southeastern Canada, peaking at over 3 inches (76 mm) in the Montérégie region of Quebec. The rainfall led to severe flooding in Victoriaville, causing damage to roads, bridges, and crops. Damage totalled to about $250,000 (1971 CND, $245,000 1971 USD).

Throughout its path, Tropical Storm Doria caused seven deaths and $147.6 million in damage (1971 USD).

In early September 1971, President Richard Nixon declared counties in New Jersey, New York, and Pennsylvania as disaster areas due to heavy rains and flooding. This allowed citizens in disaster areas to apply for federal assistance.

== See also ==
- Hurricane Irene (2011)
- Hurricane Isaias (2020)
- List of Delaware hurricanes
- List of New Jersey hurricanes
- List of New England hurricanes
- List of North Carolina hurricanes
