= Ewan, New Jersey =

Populated place in Gloucester County, New Jersey, US

- Unincorporated community
- Ewan's location in Gloucester County (Inset: Gloucester County in New Jersey) Ewan (New Jersey) Ewan (the United States)
- Coordinates: 39°41′55″N 75°11′10″W
- Country: United States
- State: New Jersey
- County: Gloucester
- Township: Harrison
- Elevation: 115 ft (35 m)
- Time zone: UTC−05:00 (Eastern (EST))
  - Summer (DST): UTC−04:00 (EDT)
- ZIP Code: 08025
- GNIS feature ID: 876244

Ewan is an unincorporated community located within Harrison Township, in Gloucester County, in the U.S. state of New Jersey. The area is served by the United States Postal Service as ZIP Code 08025.

The community is located east of Raccoon Creek and Ewan Lake, near the intersection of Ewan Road and Clems Run, 2.0 miles (3.2 km) south-southwest of Richwood and 3.5 miles (5.6 km) southeast of Mullica Hill.

Constructed in 1793, the Iredell House No. 2, located on Ewan Road, was constructed by Thomas Iredell for his second wife. The peak of the front of the house shows the letter "I", underneath that the letters "T.A.R." and below that the number 1793; the three letters are thought to be the initials of Iredell's three children.
