= List of storms named Isaias =

The name Isaias has been used for two tropical cyclones in the Atlantic Ocean:

- Hurricane Isaias (2020) – a Category 1 hurricane that caused extensive damage across the Caribbean and the East Coast of the United States; also was the earliest ninth named Atlantic basin storm
- Hurricane Isaias (2026) – a Category 3 hurricane that impacted the Gulf Coast of the United States; also tied a record for the latest-forming first Atlantic hurricane of a season set in 1905

== See also ==
- Storm Gloria – a winter storm named Isaiah by the Weather Channel.
