= List of Pennsylvania hurricanes =

As of 2021 Pennsylvania has been affected by approximately 53 tropical storms and hurricanes, some with winds reaching as high as 75 miles per hour (121 km/h). The state is landlocked in the Northeastern United States. No storm has ever made landfall in the state, though many storms, notably Hurricane Irene, Hurricane Ida, and Hurricane Agnes have passed through the state as an extratropical cyclone. The strongest winds in the state were from Hurricane Sandy. Winds of 81 miles per hour (130 km/h) were recorded in Allentown, Pennsylvania. While it is very uncommon for a system to hit Pennsylvania while tropical, many systems see their remnants pass through the state.

== List of tropical cyclones ==
=== Pre-1900 ===
==== 1876-1899 ====
- September 18, 1876 – A tropical storm produced sustained winds of up to 55 miles per hour (89 km/h) (89 km/h) in parts of Pennsylvania.
- September 13, 1878 – An extratropical storm produced at least 45 miles per hour (72 km/h) (70 km/h) sustained winds throughout the state.
- October 24, 1878 – The Gale of 1878 destroyed at least 700 buildings, caused $2 million in damage, killed at least ten people, and injured more, and produced 80 km/h sustained winds throughout the state.
- October 13, 1885 – An extratropical storm produced 44 miles per hour (71 km/h) (70 km/h) sustained winds throughout the state.
- August 22, 1888 – A tropical storm produced 46 miles per hour (74 km/h) (75 km/h) sustained winds throughout the state.
- August 29, 1893 – A tropical storm produced 62 miles per hour (100 km/h) (100 km/h) sustained winds throughout the state.
- October 25, 1893 – A tropical storm produced 40 miles (64 km) per hour 65 km/h sustained winds.
- September 30, 1896 – The extratropical remnants of the Cedar Keys hurricane produced close to 60 miles per hour (97 km/h) sustained winds.
- November 1, 1899 – An extratropical storm produced sustained winds of 60 miles (97 km) per hour.

=== 1900s ===
==== 1900s-1920s ====
- June 29, 1902 – An extratropical storm caused 65 knots (75 mph) winds throughout the state.
- September 16, 1903 – The Vagabond Hurricane affected Pennsylvania as a tropical storm with winds of 40 miles per hour (64 km/h), after making landfall in New Jersey with hurricane-force winds.
- August 4, 1915 – A tropical depression caused winds of 30 miles (48 km) per hour.
- October 1, 1915 – An extratropical storm caused winds of 40 miles (64 km) per hour.
- October 24, 1923 – An extratropical storm caused winds of 45 miles (72 km) per hour.
- September 20, 1928 – An extratropical storm caused winds of 45 miles (72 km) per hour.
- October 3, 1929 – An extratropical storm caused winds of 35 miles (56 km) per hour.

==== 1930s-1940s ====
- September 21, 1932 – A tropical depression caused winds of 20 miles (32 km) per hour.
- August 24, 1933 – A tropical storm caused winds of 50 miles (80 km) per hour.
- August 19, 1939 – A tropical depression caused winds of 30 miles (48 km) per hour.
- September 19, 1945 – An extratropical storm caused winds of 30 miles (48 km) per hour.
- August 29, 1949 – A tropical storm caused winds of 50 miles (80 km) per hour.

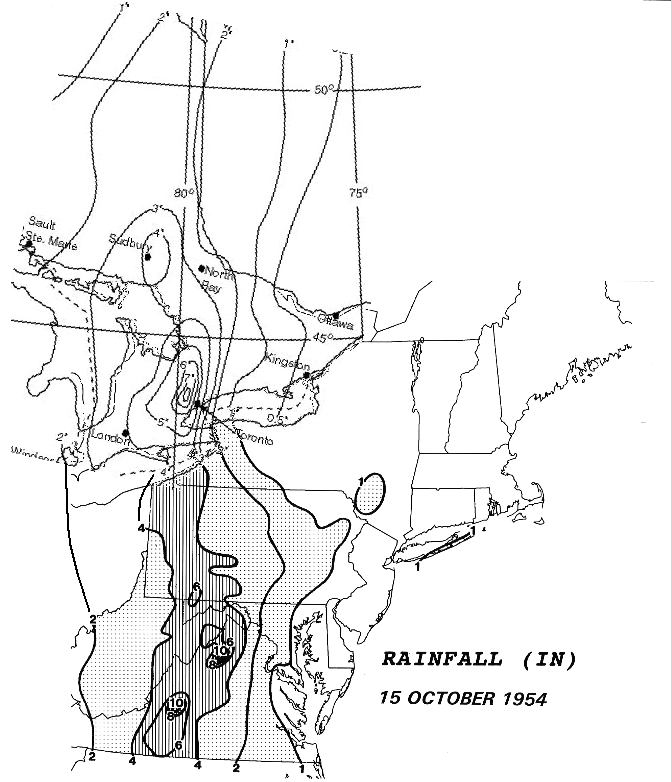
Hazel's rainfall amounts across the Northeast and Mid-Atlantic regions of the United States, including Pennsylvania

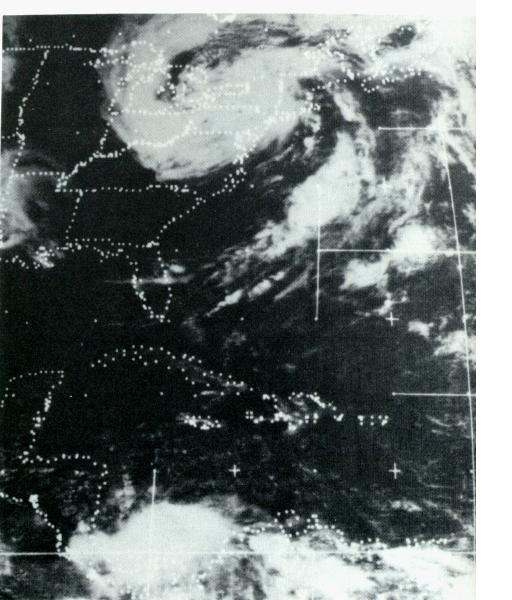
Hurricane Agnes over Pennsylvania

==== 1950s ====
- September 1, 1952 – Tropical Storm Able affected Pennsylvania as a tropical storm and tropical depression after making landfall in South Carolina as a hurricane.
- October 15, 1954 – Hurricane Hazel caused hurricane-force winds and small portions with 6 inches (150 mm) or more of rain.
- August 1955 – Hurricanes Connie and Diane both caused as much as 10 inches (250 mm) of rain and tropical storm force winds. Over 10,000 people lost power due to Connie. $70 million (1955 USD) was lost in the state and over 101 deaths were reported due to Diane.

==== 1970s-1980s ====
- June 21 – 22, 1972 – Hurricane Agnes caused rain and some winds. It caused widespread rains of 6 to 12 inches (300 mm) with local amounts up to 19 inches (480 mm).
- September 6, 1979 – Tropical Storm David caused tropical storm force winds and at least 5 inches (13 cm) of rain.
- September 1987 – Tropical Depression Nine brought at least 5 inches (13 cm) of rain to part of the state.

==== 1990s ====
- September 26, 1992 – Tropical Storm Danielle caused tropical storm force winds and around 2 inches (5.1 cm) of rain.
- August 18, 1994 – Tropical Depression Beryl caused some rain and tropical depression winds. Many evacuations occurred due to the storm, while roads were also closed. One house burned down in Middlebury Township. Damage in the state totaled at least $575,000.
- September 1996 – Tropical Storm Fran caused flash flooding in about 15 Western Pennsylvania counties as rainfall up to 7 inches (18 cm) (178 mm) caused the Juniata River to overrun its banks, with flash flooding also occurring.
- August 29 – 31, 1999 – Hurricane Dennis caused tropical depression force winds and five inches (127 mm) of rain. Around 414 homes were damaged in the state. In a trailer park at a campground, multiple trailers were swept away. Flood waters totaling 8 feet (2.4 m) hit Swatara Township, resulting in the entire town evacuating. Damages totaled more than $800,000.

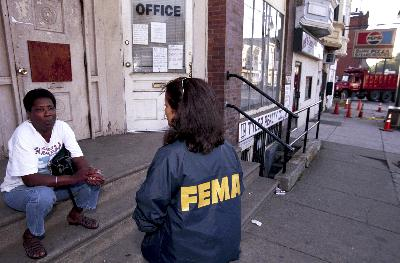
A Federal Emergency Management Agency (FEMA) worker with a flood victim from Floyd in Philadelphia

Floyd's rain affecting Pennsylvania, and surrounding states

- September 16, 1999 – Hurricane Floyd, which was a tropical storm by the time it reached Pennsylvania, caused 13 deaths and 10 inches (250 mm) of rain in the eastern part of the commonwealth. It produced a 2.8 ft (0.85 m) storm surge in Philadelphia. Multiple counties saw major evacuations, over 7,000. Many cars, despite barricades, were swept into the rushing floodwaters. 500,000 homes lost power due to Floyd. In addition to the 13 deaths, over 40 people were severely injured. 4,000 people were left homeless. Damage from the storm totaled $60 million.

=== 2000 onwards ===
==== 2000s ====
- June 16, 2001 – Tropical Storm Allison caused rain and extensive damage. Rainfall reached 10 inches (250 mm) in some parts of the Philadelphia area. Some 241 homes were destroyed, at least 1,300 were majorly damaged, and 3 buildings of an Apartment Complex caught fire due to an explosion after a gas leak. A total of 7 lives were lost in the Philadelphia area, and damage totaled to $215 million.
- September 2003 – Tropical Storm Henri's remnants caused rain and $3.5 million in damage. 12 homes were destroyed, 380 majorly damaged (half being severely damaged) and 109,000 PECO customers were without power.
- September 17, 2003 – Hurricane Isabel caused one death in Lancaster County due to carbon monoxide poisoning brought on by the storm, and brought strong winds to parts of the state. Damage in the state totaled $160 million.

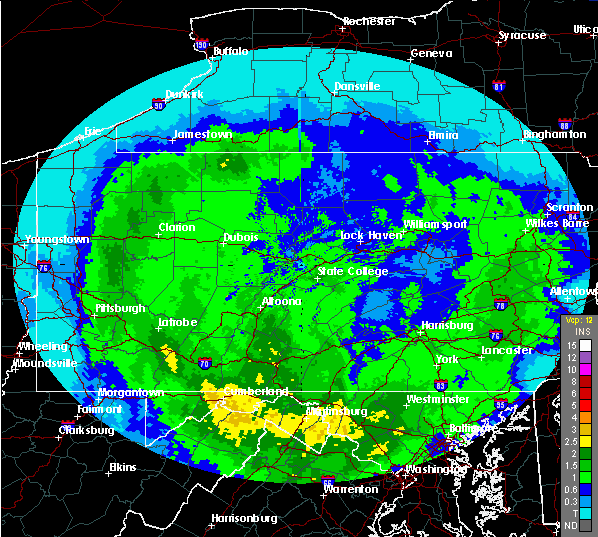
Radar estimated rainfall from Ernesto

- September 18, 2004 – Hurricane Ivan caused some of the worst flooding in Pittsburgh. The highest ever 24-hour rain total in the city was reported at the Pittsburgh International Airport.
- September 1–2, 2006 – Tropical Depression Ernesto caused 2.5–3 inches (64–76 mm) of rain in parts of the south-western portion of the state. 2 deaths were reported in the state.
- June 4, 2007 – Tropical Depression Barry caused 1.66 inches (42 mm) of rain, reported at Philadelphia International Airport.
- September 6, 2008 – The remnants of Tropical Storm Hanna led to a possible EF1 tornado that may have touched down in Allentown, Pennsylvania.
- September 14, 2008 – The remnants of Hurricane Ike caused 180,000 people to be without power in western Pennsylvania, wind gusts over 70 miles per hour (110 km/h), and other wind damage. In Oil City, one person was killed by a falling tree limb. A state of emergency was declared for Pennsylvania.

==== 2010s ====
- August 28, 2011 – Hurricane Irene left 706,000 people without power in eastern Pennsylvania, and killed three people in Northampton County, Luzerne County, and Pocono Township. Philadelphia Mayor Michael Nutter declared a state of emergency for the first time since 1986. Hurricane Irene brought rain and wind gusts of up to 54 miles per hour (87 km/h) at the Philadelphia International Airport. Tornado warnings were issued in southeastern Pennsylvania, although no tornadoes were ultimately observed. Irene also brought winds of nearly 70 miles per hour (110 km/h) along the coast and 40 to 60 miles per hour (97 km/h) inland. The storm left five people dead in the state.
- September 5, 2011 – The remnants of Tropical Storm Lee brought 6 to 10 inches (250 mm) of rain in Pennsylvania, some areas over 14 inches (36 cm). Lee's leftovers spread into the Mid-Atlantic and Northeast, in some areas causing severe flooding, and record rainfalls throughout much of eastern Pennsylvania. On September 7, 2011, emergency management officials in Northumberland County, Bradford County, Susquehanna County, Columbia County, and Luzerne County declared a state of emergency, and mandatory evacuations because of major flooding; schools were closed due to rising river levels. County officials determined that numerous roads were covered by water or washed out. A number of bridges were affected by high water. In parts of Wilkes-Barre, severe flooding hadn't been seen since Hurricane Agnes of 1972. Over 2,000 homes were damaged in Lebanon County. Damage in the state totaled over $177 million.
- October 29–30, 2012 – Hurricane Sandy brought over 20 inches (51 cm) of rain to southern Pennsylvania and caused 14 deaths. Over 1.2 million people were without electricity throughout the state. On October 29, a State of Emergency was declared. In Philadelphia, all major roads and highways were closed and people in low-lying areas were evacuated, and schools and jobs were closed for more than a week. By October 31, people were able to return home. Social media referred to Hurricane Sandy as "Superstorm Sandy."
- June 7, 2013 – Tropical Storm Andrea impacted south-eastern Pennsylvania with rainfall of 1–3 inches (25–76 mm) in Bucks, Montgomery, and other southern counties in the state.
- June 23–24, 2017 – The remnants of Tropical Storm Cindy bought flash flooding in eastern Pennsylvania, specifically Philadelphia, following with more than 6 inches (150 mm) of rain in southwestern Pennsylvania. An EF1 tornado was confirmed near Lone Pine, with damage to trees and homes.
- September 8, 2018 – The remnants of Tropical Storm Gordon were absorbed by a large front. The new system brings rainfall to the state for several days. Notably, a game between the Pittsburgh Pirates and the Miami Marlins was postponed.

==== 2020s ====
- July 9–11, 2020 – Part of Tropical Storm Fay hit Delaware and subsequently Pennsylvania. Flash flooding occurred in Wynnewood. At least 6 drivers needed rescue after getting trapped in rushing waters. Eastern Pennsylvania saw more flash flooding, while some trees were downed.
- August 19, 2021 – The remnants of Tropical Storm Fred struck Pennsylvania, bringing 6 tornadoes. Leonard Harrison State Park was temporarily closed due to flooding from the storm.
- August 24, 2021 – Hurricane Henri caused heavy rainfall is Eastern Pennsylvania. Notably, multiple parking lots and basements suffered damage. A sewer also overflowed in Dunmore. 6.03 inches (153 mm) fell in Albrightsville, 5.80 inches (147 mm) in Gouldsboro, 5.68 inches (144 mm) in Mount Pocono, 5.54 inches (141 mm) in Jim Thorpe, 4.86 inches (123 mm) in Stroudsburg, and 4.29 inches (109 mm) in Thornhurst.
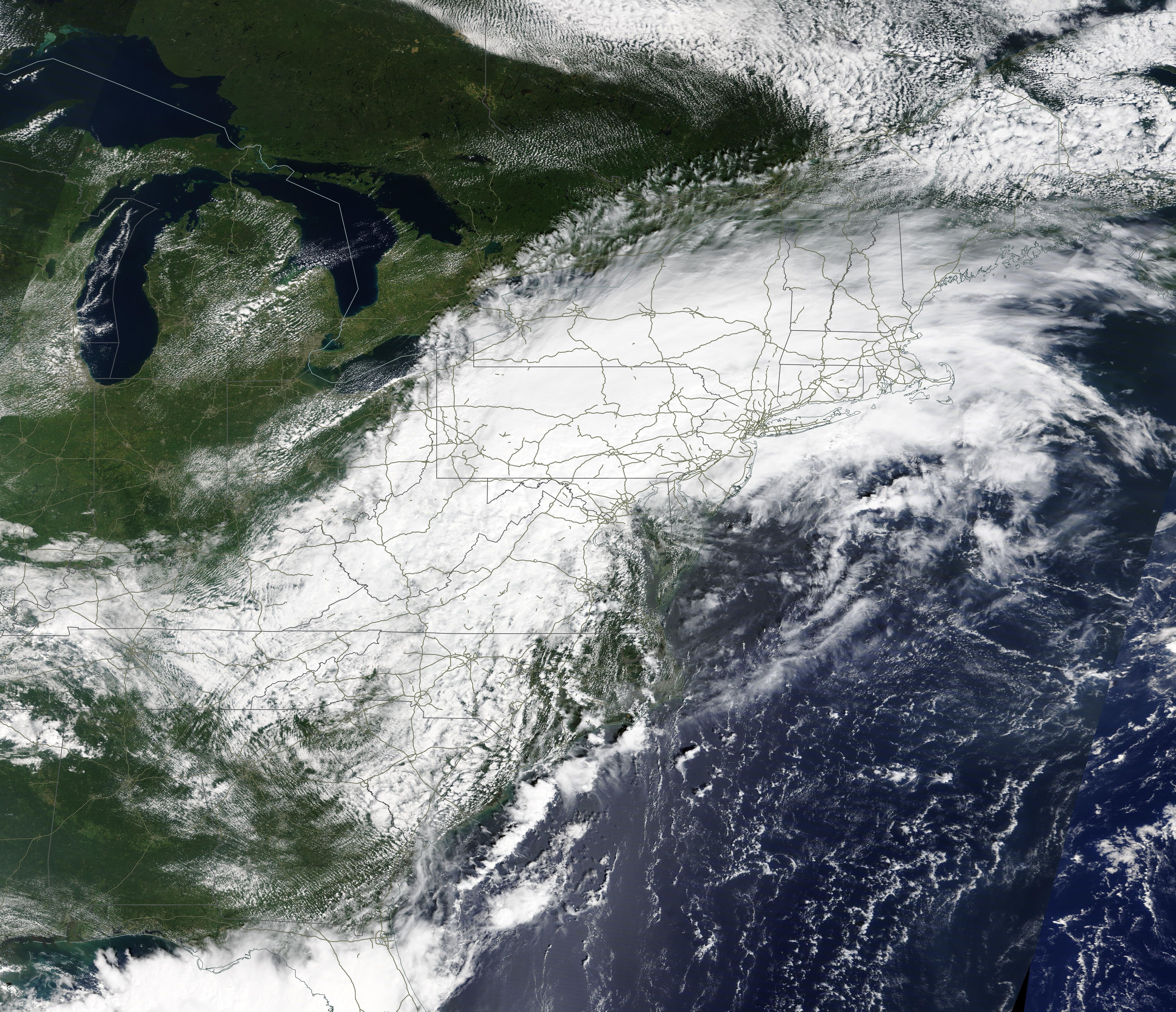
- Hurricane Ida in Pennsylvania on September 1, 2021.
  I-676 Flooded in Downtown Philly on September 2, 2021
  August 31-September 5, 2021 – Days after Hurricane Ida hit Louisiana as a Category 4 hurricane with 145 miles per hour (233 km/h) winds, the remnants travel to Pennsylvania, bringing record flooding and extensive tornado damage. The National Weather service predicted that 9/1 could be one of the top five wettest days on record in central PA, behind Hurricane Agnes (1972) and Tropical Storm Lee (2011). The storm brought at least 5 inches (130 mm) of rain at Harrisburg International airport and 7 inches (180 mm) of rain in Lancaster. The Schuylkill River crested at 17.2 feet (5.2 m) and flooded parts of Philadelphia; Interstate 676, which ran through the city, was inundated. Five people were killed in the state, and damage ranged from $2.5–3.5 billion. Around $100 million was lost in Southern Pennsylvania. Multiple tornadoes were reported as well.
- October 2, 2022 - The remnants of Hurricane Ian brought a daily record of 1.99 in (51 mm) of rain to Philadelphia.
- September 23-25, 2023 - The remnants of Tropical Storm Ophelia bring rainfall to the state, peaking at 2.78 in (71 mm) in Carlisle.
- August 8-9, 2024 - Hurricane Debby caused 1.5 in (38 mm) in West Chester, Pennsylvania and 1.1 in (28 mm) of rain in Philadelphia. This was after heavy rains fell in the region from August 6–7. 19 people had to be rescued at Dover Township, Pennsylvania.
- July 7, 2025 - Tropical Storm Chantal caused up to 4.3 in (110 mm) of rain fell in the Philadelphia metropolitan area, and a ground stop was issued at Philadelphia International Airport on July 7.
- October 11, 2026 - The remnants of Hurricane Isaias caused flooding across portions of Western Pennsylvania.

== Listed by month ==
Number of recorded storms affecting Pennsylvania
Month	Number of storms
June	6
July	2
August	13
September	25
October	9
November	1

== Deadly storms ==
The following table includes all storms which causes fatalities in Pennsylvania.

Name	Year	Number of deaths
Diane	1955	101
Agnes	1972	50
Sandy	2012	14
Floyd	1999	13
Gale of 1878	1878	10
Allison	2001	7
Connie	1955	6
Ida	2021	5
Irene	2011	5
Fran	1996	4
Ernesto	2006	2
Isabel	2003	1
Ike	2008	1
Able	1952	1

== See also ==
- List of New Jersey hurricanes
- List of New York hurricanes
- List of New England hurricanes
- List of Delaware hurricanes
