= List of Virginia hurricanes =

Satellite image of Hurricane Isabel entering the state in September 2003

Since 1851, 122 tropical or subtropical cyclones have either directly or indirectly affected the state of Virginia, with the most recent being Helene in 2024. On average, around one tropical storm or its associated remnants can be expected to impact the state annually, with hurricane impacts averaging once every 2.3 years. Regardless of the month, most systems that affect Virginia move from the southwest in a northeasterly direction as a result of complex steering currents driven by the Azores High. Consequently, few tropical cyclones make landfall in Virginia, with the vast majority passing through the state after already being over land.

== Events ==
=== Pre-1900 ===
- September 10, 1854 – A tropical storm moved through far southeastern Virginia.
- August 19–20, 1856 – A tropical storm moved through eastern Virginia.
- September 17, 1859 – A tropical storm moved through the state.
- September 27, 1861 – A tropical storm moved through eastern Virginia.
- September 18, 1863 – A tropical storm moved through eastern Virginia.
- October 25–26, 1872 – A tropical storm moved through eastern Virginia, producing heavy rainfall.
- September 29, 1874 – A tropical storm moved through the state.
- September 17–18, 1876 – A Category 1 hurricane moved through the state, bringing heavy rain and strong winds.
- October 4, 1877 – The extratropical remnants of a former hurricane moved through the state, bringing flooding.
- September 13, 1878 – A tropical storm moved through the state, producing multiple tornadoes.
- October 23, 1878 – A Category 2 hurricane moved through eastern Virginia. The hurricane brought destructive winds to much of the state, and resulted in numerous shipwrecks. At least 19 deaths were reported.
- August 18, 1879 – A Category 2 hurricane paralleled the Virginia coastline, bringing heavy rain and destructive winds to eastern portions of the state.
- September 10, 1881 – A tropical storm moved through far southeastern Virginia.
- September 11, 1882 – A tropical storm moved through the state.
- September 23, 1882 – A tropical storm moved through eastern Virginia, producing heavy rainfall.
- September 12–13, 1883 – A tropical storm moved through the state.
- October 13, 1885 – The extratropical remnants of a tropical storm moved through the state.
- June 23, 1886 – A tropical storm moved through the state.
- July 2, 1886 – A tropical storm moved through the state.
- October 31, 1887 – While passing well offshore, a tropical storm brought destructive winds to coastal Virginia. Numerous shipwrecks occurred, and in total, at least two deaths were reported.
- September 11, 1888 – A tropical storm moved through the state, bringing heavy rainfall.
- September 24–25, 1889 – A tropical storm moved through the state.
- August 29, 1893 – A tropical storm moved through the state.
- October 14, 1893 – A Category 1 hurricane moved through the state, producing heavy rain and strong winds.
- October 23, 1893 – A tropical storm made landfall on the eastern shore of the Delmarva Peninsula.
- October 10, 1894 – A tropical storm moved through the state.
- July 9, 1896 – A tropical depression moved through western Virginia, producing heavy rain and several tornadoes. In total, six deaths were reported.
- September 30, 1896 – A Category 1 hurricane moved through the state, bringing heavy rain and strong winds. In total, seven deaths were reported.
- October 31, 1899 – A tropical storm moved through the state. The storm produced heavy rainfall and brought high tides to coastal areas.

=== 1900–1949 ===
- September 28, 1901 – The extratropical remnants of a tropical storm moved through western Virginia.
- June 16, 1902 – The extratropical remnants of a tropical storm moved through the state.
- October 12, 1902 – The extratropical remnants of a former hurricane moved through the state.
- October 8–10, 1903 – A distant tropical storm brought strong winds and dangerous ocean conditions to the state whilst remaining far offshore, resulting in three deaths.
- September 15, 1904 – A tropical storm moved through the state.
- October 11, 1905 – The extratropical remnants of a tropical storm moved through the state.
- June 30, 1907 – The extratropical remnants of a tropical storm briefly moved through far southeastern Virginia.
- August 4, 1915 – A tropical storm moved through the state.
- May 16, 1916 – The extratropical remnants of a tropical storm moved through eastern Virginia.
- September 24, 1920 – A tropical depression briefly entered western Virginia, dissipating shortly after.
- September 30, 1924 – The extratropical remnants of a tropical storm moved through eastern Virginia.
- October 4, 1927 – A tropical depression moved through the state.
- August 11–12, 1928 – The extratropical remnants of a former hurricane moved through the state, dropping heavy rain.
- August 16, 1928 – A tropical depression briefly moved through western Virginia.
- September 19–20, 1928 – The extratropical remnants of a former hurricane moved through the state, producing moderately heavy rainfall and strong winds.
- October 2, 1929 – The extratropical remnants of a former hurricane moved through the state.
- October 18, 1932 – The extratropical remnants of a tropical storm entered western Virginia, dissipating shortly after.
- August 23–24, 1933 – A Category 1 hurricane moved through eastern Virginia, bringing heavy rainfall and damaging winds, as well as a significant storm surge in coastal areas. Cape Henry recorded sustained winds of 80 mph (130 km/h), while up to 10 in (250 mm) of rain fell in Chesapeake. 18 deaths were reported.
- September 16, 1933 – A Category 2 hurricane paralleled the Virginia coastline, bringing destructive high tides and powerful winds to eastern portions of the state.
- June 19, 1934 – The extratropical remnants of a former hurricane moved through northern Virginia.
- September 3–4, 1934 – A tropical depression moved through the state.
- September 6, 1935 – A tropical storm moved through southeastern Virginia, bringing strong winds and multiple tornadoes. In total, three deaths were reported.
- September 18, 1936 – A Category 1 hurricane paralleled the Virginia coastline, producing high winds and destructive flooding, particularly in Norfolk. One death was reported.
- September 21, 1938 – A fast-moving Category 3 hurricane brought moderate rainfall and strong winds to areas of coastal Virginia while passing offshore.
- August 19, 1939 – A tropical depression moved through northern Virginia.
- August 14, 1940 – A tropical depression briefly moved into western Virginia, quickly dissipating shortly after.
- October 1, 1943 – A tropical storm made landfall on the eastern shore of the Delmarva Peninsula.
- August 2, 1944 – A tropical storm moved through the state.
- September 14, 1944 – A Category 3 hurricane closely paralleled the Virginia coastline, resulting in highly destructive hurricane force winds and major flooding. Sustained winds of 134 mph (216 km/h) lashed Cape Henry, with gusts potentially reaching up to 150 mph (240 km/h). At least 46 deaths were reported in the state.
- October 21, 1944 – The extratropical remnants of a former hurricane moved through the state, producing minor damage.
- September 18, 1945 – The extratropical remnants of a former hurricane moved through the state.
- August 28–29, 1949 – A tropical storm moved through the state, bringing heavy rain.

=== 1950–1999 ===
- August 28, 1952 – A tropical depression moved through western Virginia.
- September 1, 1952 – Former Hurricane Able moved through the state as a tropical storm, producing light rainfall and winds.
- October 15, 1954 – The extratropical remnants of Hurricane Hazel moved through the state, producing high winds and significant high tides. In total, 12 deaths were reported.
- August 13, 1955 – Hurricane Connie entered southeastern Virginia as a Category 1 hurricane, producing heavy rain and high winds. A boat capsized in Chesapeake Bay as a result of the system, killing 11 people. In total, 15 deaths were reported.
- August 18, 1955 – Former Hurricane Diane moved through the state as a tropical storm, producing heavy rainfall and significant flooding.
- July 10, 1959 – Former Hurricane Cindy moved through southeastern Virginia as a tropical storm, producing several tornadoes.
- September 30, 1959 – Former Hurricane Gracie moved through western Virginia as a tropical storm, producing heavy rainfall and multiple destructive tornadoes. In total, 12 deaths were reported.
- July 30, 1960 – Tropical Storm Brenda moved through eastern Virginia as a tropical storm, producing heavy rainfall.
- September 12, 1960 – Hurricane Donna paralleled the Virginia coastline as a Category 2 hurricane, bringing destructive hurricane force winds to eastern portions of the state, as well as heavy rain. In total, three deaths were reported.
- September 14, 1961 – A tropical storm moved through eastern portions of Virginia.
- June 3, 1963 – A tropical storm moved through eastern portions of Virginia.
- June 19, 1967 – A tropical depression briefly moved through far southeastern Virginia.
- September 16–17, 1967 – Former Hurricane Doria paralleled the Virginia coastline as a tropical storm, producing moderately heavy rainfall and strong winds.
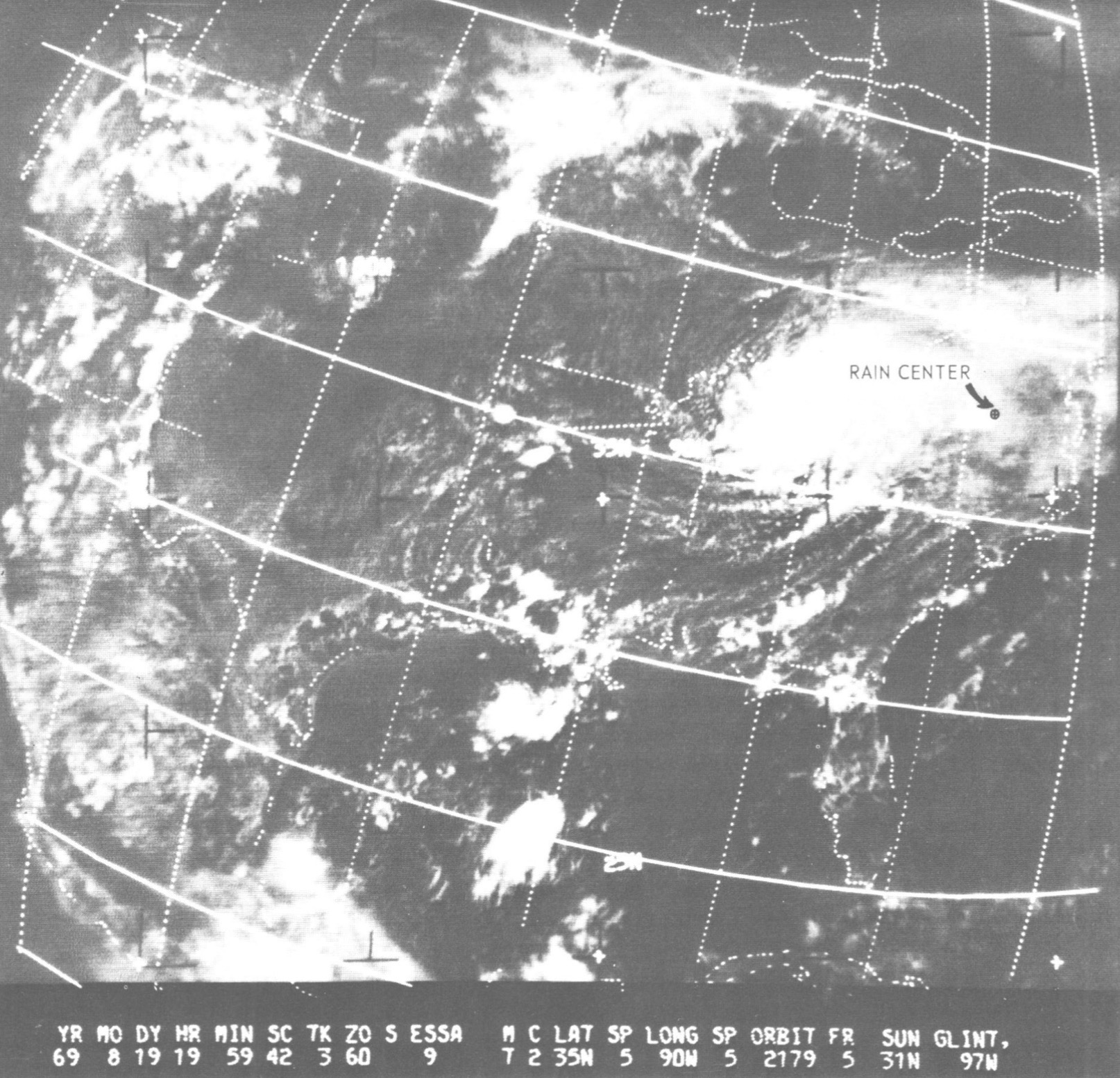
  Former Hurricane Camille moving into Virginia on August 19
- August 20, 1969 – Former Hurricane Camille entered the western portion of Virginia as a tropical depression and moved across the state. Enhanced by an approaching cold front, Camille dropped torrential rainfall along the Blue Ridge Mountains, including 27.0 in (690 mm) of rain in just eight hours in Nelson County. This made it the wettest known tropical cyclone in the state. The rains caused flash flooding that killed 153 people and left US$140 million in damage. Camille wrecked or damaged 2,598 houses in the state.
- August 28, 1971 – Tropical Storm Doria moved through southeastern Virginia as a tropical storm, bringing heavy rain and strong winds. One death was reported.
- October 2–3, 1971 - Former Hurricane Ginger moved through the state as a tropical depression, bringing heavy rainfall and significant beach erosion along the coast.
- September 24, 1975 – The extratropical remnants of Hurricane Eloise moved through western Virginia, bringing significant flooding.
- September 16–17, 1976 – A subtropical depression briefly entered southern Virginia, dissipating shortly after.
- July 14–15, 1979 – Former Hurricane Bob slowly moved through the state as a weak tropical depression.
- September 5–6, 1979 – Former Hurricane David moved through the state as a tropical storm, producing significant flooding and winds, as well as several tornadoes. One death was reported.
- July 1, 1981 – Tropical Storm Bret made landfall on the eastern shore of the Delmarva Peninsula as a tropical storm, producing only minor damage.
- September 30, 1983 – Tropical Storm Dean made landfall on the eastern shore of the Delmarva Peninsula as a tropical storm, producing localized and overall minor damage.
- July 25–26, 1985 – Former Hurricane Bob moved through the state as a tropical depression, producing strong winds and multiple tornadoes, including a powerful F3 tornado in Greene County.
- August 19, 1985 – The extratropical remnants of Hurricane Danny moved through the state, producing heavy rainfall in the Roanoke Valley region. Precipitation amounts ranged from 7 to 8 inches (180 to 200 mm), with estimates of 10 inches (250 mm) in isolated locations.
- August 29, 1988 – The extratropical remnants of Tropical Storm Chris moved through the state, producing little damage.
- September 22, 1989 – Former Hurricane Hugo moved through western Virginia as a tropical storm, producing strong wind gusts that caused sporadic damage. In total, six deaths were reported.
- August 18-19, 1991 – Hurricane Bob brushed the Outer Banks.
- September 25, 1992 – Tropical Storm Danielle made landfall on the eastern shore of the Delmarva Peninsula as a tropical storm, bringing minor flooding and wind damage.
- August 17–18, 1994 – Tropical Storm Beryl moved through the state as a tropical depression, dropping up to 7 in (180 mm) of rain in Carroll and Grayson counties.
- July 13, 1996 – Former Hurricane Bertha moved through the state as a tropical storm, causing minor rainfall and wind gusts.
- September 6, 1996 – Former Hurricane Fran moved through the state as a tropical storm, producing major rainfall and significant winds. Up to 16 in (410 mm) of rain fell in Big Meadows, causing flash flooding. Nearby, the South Fork of the Shenandoah River crested up to 37 ft (11 m) in Front Royal, 22 ft (6.7 m) above the 15 ft (4.6 m) flood stage. In total, 11 deaths were reported.
- July 24, 1997 – Former Hurricane Danny briefly moved through southeastern portions of the state as a tropical storm, producing multiple tornadoes.
- September 6–7, 1999 – Former Hurricane Dennis moved through the state as a tropical depression, bringing heavy rain and coastal flooding.
- September 16, 1999 – Hurricane Floyd moved through southeastern Virginia as a Category 1 hurricane, bringing high winds and torrential rainfall of up to 16.57 in (421 mm) in Newport News. In total, four deaths were reported.

=== 2000–present ===
- September 19, 2000 – The extratropical remnants of Hurricane Gordon moved through the state, producing minor rainfall.
- September 24, 2000 – Tropical Storm Helene passed near southeastern Virginia as a tropical storm, producing light rain in portions of the state.
- June 16–17, 2001 – Tropical Storm Allison briefly moved through southeastern portions of the state as a subtropical depression, causing minor rainfall and killing one person.
- July 3, 2003 – The extratropical remnants of Tropical Storm Bill briefly entered the state, causing minor rainfall before quickly dissipating shortly after.

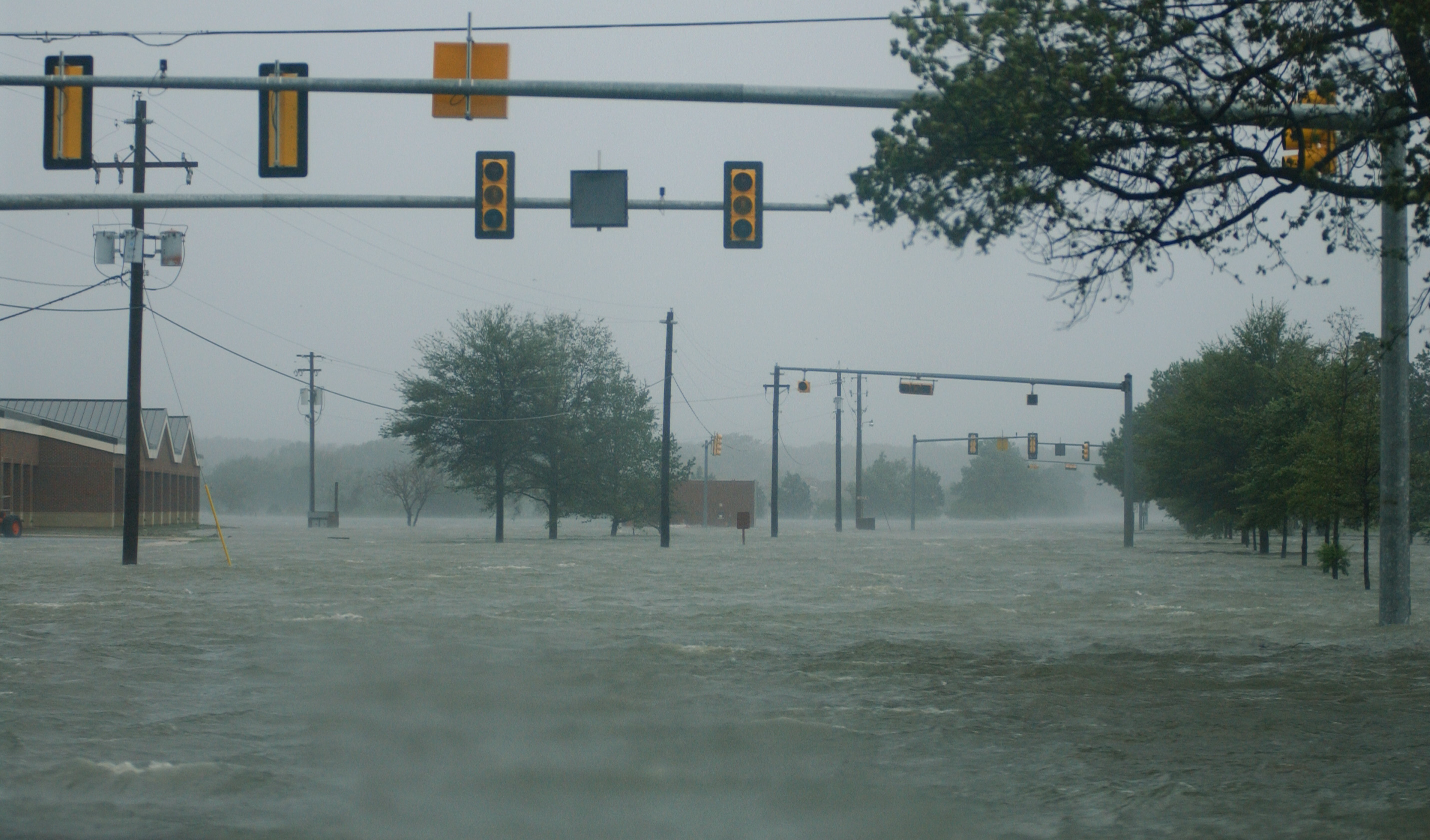
Flood waters at Langley Air Force Base in Hampton as a result of Isabel

- September 18–19, 2003 – Hurricane Isabel entered Virginia as a Category 1 hurricane with sustained winds of 75 mph (121 km/h), causing major damage to multiple regions of the state. Significant rainfall of 20.2 in (510 mm) was measured in Sherando, and a destructive storm surge estimated up to 9 feet (2.7 m) impacted Richmond along the James River. In total, Isabel was responsible for 10 direct and 22 indirect deaths in Virginia, and it remains the most recent tropical cyclone to impact the state at hurricane strength.
- August 15, 2004 – The extratropical remnants of Hurricane Charley briefly entered far southeastern portions of the state, causing minor rainfall and wind gusts.
- August 30–31, 2004 – Former Hurricane Gaston entered southern Virginia as a tropical depression, quickly restrengthening to a tropical storm shortly after whilst over the state. The storm brought major flooding, particularly in the Richmond metropolitan area, where up to 12.60 in (320 mm) of rain fell. In total, nine deaths were reported.
- September 8, 2004 – Former Hurricane Frances moved through western Virginia as a tropical depression. The storm produced heavy rain of up to 11.50 inches (292 mm) in Big Meadows, as well as multiple tornadoes.
- September 17–18, 2004 – Former Hurricane Ivan moved through the state as a tropical depression. The storm produced heavy rain and a major tornado outbreak, with an F3 tornado striking near Remington.
- September 28, 2004 – Former Hurricane Jeanne moved through the state as a tropical depression, bringing heavy rain and flash flooding. One drowning-related death was reported in Patrick County.
- July 8, 2005 – The extratropical remnants of Hurricane Cindy moved through Virginia, causing localized flooding in northern portions of the state.
- September 1–2, 2006 – The extratropical remnants of Hurricane Ernesto moved through the state, bringing substantial rainfall and wind damage. Up to 10.43 inches (265 mm) of rain fell in Virginia Beach, and wind gusts up to 76 mph (122 km/h) were observed near the York River. In total, seven deaths were reported.
- September 6, 2008 – Former Hurricane Hanna moved through the state as a tropical storm, producing heavy rainfall of up to 9.65 in (245 mm) in Woodbridge.
- June 8, 2013 – The extratropical remnants of Tropical Storm Andrea moved through the state, producing heavy rain. Rainfall totals of up to 7.73 in (196 mm) were observed in Williamsburg, and one death was reported as a result of a traffic accident.
- May 11, 2015 – Tropical Storm Ana moved through southeastern portions of the state as a tropical depression, producing little damage.
- June 24, 2017 – The extratropical remnants of Tropical Storm Cindy briefly entered the state, quickly dissipating shortly after and causing little damage.
- September 27, 2018 – Former Hurricane Florence moved through western Virginia as a tropical depression, producing flooding and numerous tornadoes. In total, three deaths were reported.
- October 12, 2018 – Former Hurricane Michael brought flooding and tornadoes to Virginia after entering the state as a tropical storm, quickly transitioning to an extratropical storm shortly after. Rainfall totals of up to 10 in (250 mm) were observed in the southernmost portions of the state, and over 600,000 customers lost power during the height of the system. In total, five deaths were reported.
- October 20, 2019 – The extratropical remnants of Tropical Storm Nestor briefly moved through southeastern Virginia, producing light rainfall.
- May 28, 2020 – The extratropical remnants of Tropical Storm Bertha briefly moved through western Virginia, producing minor damage.
- August 4, 2020 – Former Hurricane Isaias moved through eastern portions of the state as a tropical storm, producing strong winds and several tornadoes. Sustained winds of 72 mph (117 km/h) were observed at the Chesapeake Bay Bridge–Tunnel, with gusts up to 87 mph (141 km/h) in the Chesapeake Channel.
- October 29, 2020 – Former Hurricane Zeta briefly brought strong winds to Virginia after entering the state as a tropical storm, quickly transitioning to an extratropical storm shortly after.
- July 9, 2021 – Former Hurricane Elsa moved through the state as a tropical storm, producing significant winds and multiple weak tornadoes.
- August 18, 2021 – The extratropical remnants of Tropical Storm Fred moved through the state, bringing flooding to western portions of Virginia.
- September 1, 2021 – The extratropical remnants of former Hurricane Ida moved through the state, producing flooding and tornadoes. One death was reported in Buchanan County.
- September 24, 2023 – The extratropical remnants of Tropical Storm Ophelia moved through the state. Tropical storm‑force winds caused sporadic damage, and a storm surge of 3.67 ft (1.12 m) above mean sea level was observed at Sewell's Point.
- August 8–9, 2024 – The extratropical remnants of Hurricane Debby moved through the state. Three EF1 tornadoes touched down as a result of the storm, causing minor damage.
- September 27, 2024 – Former Hurricane Helene passed to the southwest of Virginia as a tropical storm, producing major flooding and wind damage in the state. Rainfall reached up to 12.2 in (310 mm) in the Grayson Highlands, and in the New River Valley, high water levels of up to 19.5 ft (5.9 m) were observed in Damascus. In total, three deaths were reported.
- July 6, 2025 - The extratropical remnants of Tropical Storm Chantal bring rough surf, safety reminder to Virginia Beach oceanfront on busy holiday weekend.

== Climatological statistics ==
Number of recorded storms affecting Virginia, by month of year
Month	Number of storms
January	0
February	0
March	0
April	0
May	3
June	9
July	13
August	24
September	52
October	22
November	0
December	0

Number of recorded storms affecting Virginia by decade
Period	Number of storms
1851–1859	3
1860s	2
1870s	7
1880s	10
1890s	7
1900s	7
1910s	2
1920s	7
1930s	9
1940s	7
1950s	7
1960s	7
1970s	6
1980s	6
1990s	7
2000s	13
2010s	6
2020s	10

== Deadly storms ==
The following is a list of all known tropical cyclone-related deaths in Virginia.

Name	Year	Number of deaths	Ref
Camille	1969	153	
Unnamed	1944	46	
Isabel	2003	32	
Unnamed	1878	19	
Unnamed	1933	18	
Connie	1955	15	
Hazel	1954	12	
Gracie	1959	12	
Fran	1996	11	
Gaston	2004	9	
Unnamed	1896	7	
Ernesto	2006	7	
Unnamed	1896	6	
Hugo	1989	6	
Michael	2018	5	
Floyd	1999	4	
Unnamed	1903	3	
Unnamed	1935	3	
Donna	1960	3	
Florence	2018	3	
Helene	2024	3	
Unnamed	1887	2	
Unnamed	1936	1	
Doria	1971	1	
David	1979	1	
Allison	2001	1	
Jeanne	2004	1	
Andrea	2013	1	
Ida	2021	1	

== See also ==
- Climate of Virginia
- List of North Carolina hurricanes
- List of United States hurricanes
