= List of storms named Able =

The name Able has been used for three tropical cyclones in the Atlantic Ocean:

- Hurricane Able (1950) – a Category 3 hurricane that ultimately hit Nova Scotia as a tropical storm
- Hurricane Able (1951) – an early-season Category 1 hurricane that briefly threatened the Bahamas and North Carolina
- Hurricane Able (1952) – a long-lived, minimal hurricane that ultimately struck South Carolina

== See also ==
Storms with similar names

- Tropical Depression Abel (1996) – a West Pacific Ocean tropical cyclone
- Cyclone Abele (2010) – a South-West Indian Ocean tropical cyclone that crossed into the Australian region
- Hurricane Hiki (1950) – a Central Pacific hurricane whose name means Able in Hawaiian
