= Gale of 1878 =

Category 2 Atlantic hurricane in 1878

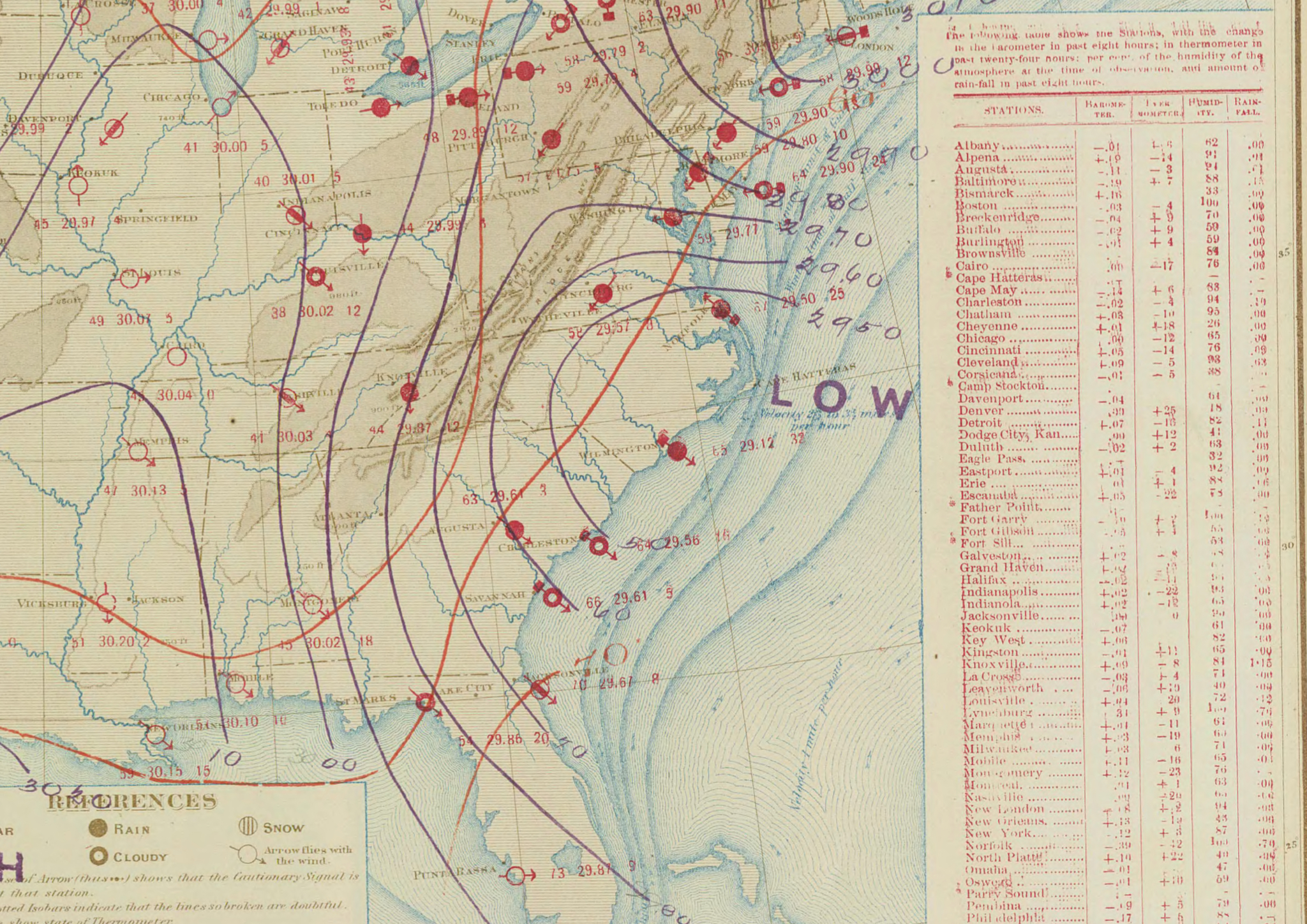
- Weather map of the hurricane nearing landfall in North Carolina on October 23

Meteorological history
- Formed: October 18, 1878
- Dissipated: October 23, 1878

Category 2 hurricane
- 1-minute sustained (SSHWS/NWS)
- Highest winds: 105 mph (165 km/h)
- Lowest pressure: 963 mbar (hPa); 28.44 inHg

Overall effects
- Fatalities: >71
- Damage: $2.45 million (1878 USD)
- Areas affected: Cuba, Bahamas, North Carolina, Virginia, Delaware, Washington D.C., Maryland, New York, Pennsylvania, New England
- IBTrACS
- Part of the 1878 Atlantic hurricane season

The Gale of 1878 was an intense Category 2 hurricane which caused extensive damage from Cuba to New England in October 1878. Believed to be the strongest storm to hit the Washington, D.C.–Baltimore region since hurricane records began in 1851, the system is known to have existed as a cyclone by October 18, then located near Jamaica. Drifting northwestward, the system slowly strengthened, reaching hurricane status on October 20. Early the next day, the cyclone struck western Cuba, likely at Category 2 hurricane status. Turning northeastward and emerging into the Straits of Florida, the hurricane, then a Category 1, passed just east of Florida on October 22. The cyclone re-intensified into a Category 2 hurricane early on October 23 shortly before making landfall near Emerald Isle, North Carolina, with winds of 105 mph (165 km/h). The hurricane raced across the interior of the United States until becoming extratropical and merging with a cold front over New York late on October 23.

Cuba experienced hurricane-force winds and heavy rains as far east as Cienfuegos, causing damage and some loss of life. The hurricane beached more than a dozen vessels along the east coast of Florida, while Key West recorded wind gusts up to 54 mph (87 km/h). Georgia and South Carolina reported only minor impacts. Many ships sank along the coast of North Carolina, which led to four deaths and at least $200,000 (1878 USD) in damage after the steamer City of Houston was lost. (Note: All values in 1878 USD unless otherwise noted.) A total of 21 people died in Virginia, all due to shipwrecks, with 19 people killed when a ship, the A.S. Davis, was driven ashore at Virginia Beach. Severe damage occurred in coastal Virginia, including to life-saving stations, while the storm completely submerged Cobb and Smith islands. Washington, D.C., and several states farther north reported many downed trees and telegraph wires, damaged crops, and unroofed buildings, as well as five deaths in Maryland, eighteen in Delaware, twelve in Pennsylvania, eight in New Jersey, and two in Connecticut. In Philadelphia, Pennsylvania, alone, the hurricane destroyed at least 700 buildings and toppled almost 50 church spires. Damage throughout the state reached $2.14 million. Overall, the storm caused over 71 fatalities and more than $2.45 million in damage.

== Meteorological history ==
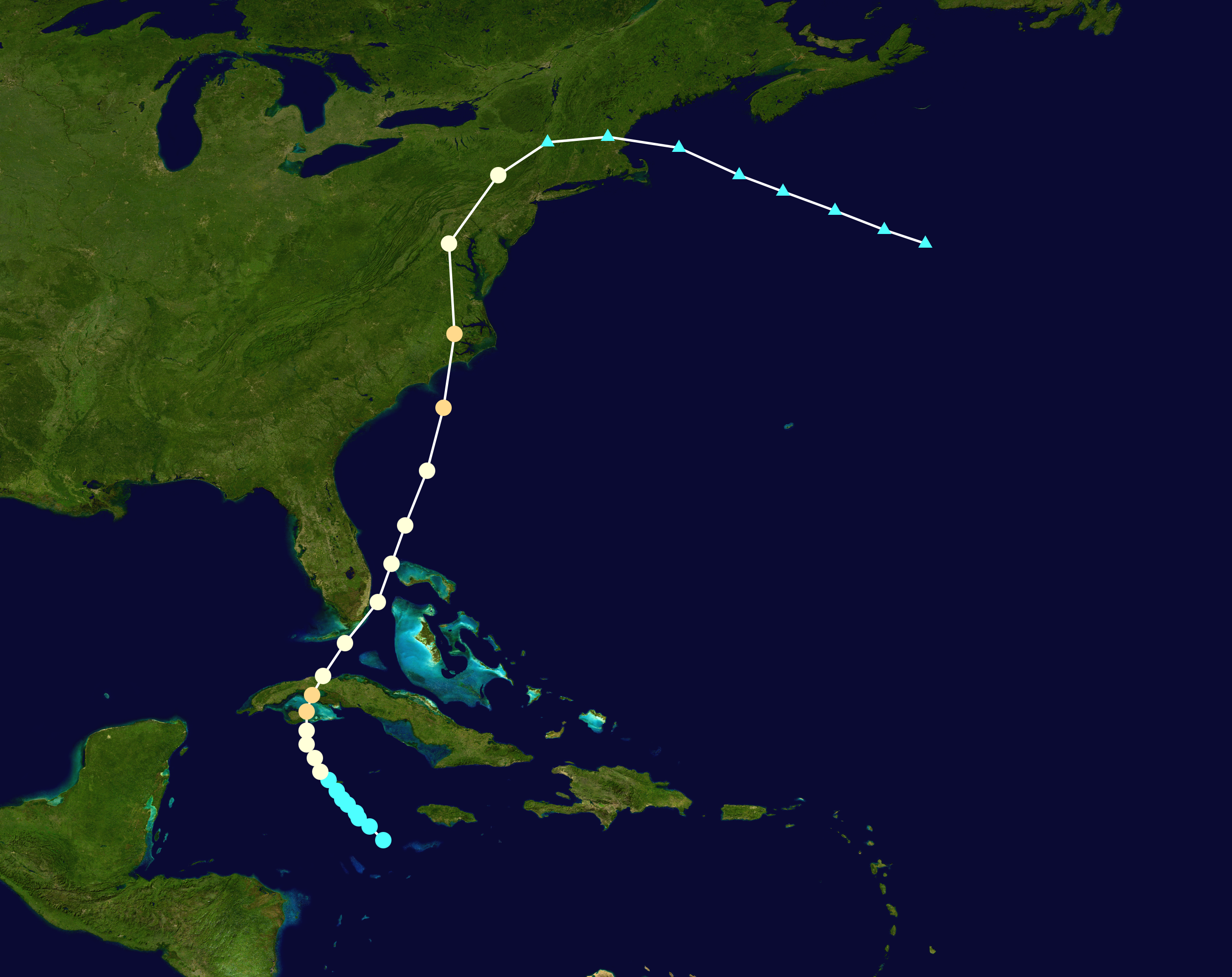
Map plotting the storm's track and intensity, according to the Saffir–Simpson scale Map key Saffir–Simpson scale Tropical depression (≤38 mph, ≤62 km/h) Tropical storm (39–73 mph, 63–118 km/h) Category 1 (74–95 mph, 119–153 km/h) Category 2 (96–110 mph, 154–177 km/h) Category 3 (111–129 mph, 178–208 km/h) Category 4 (130–156 mph, 209–251 km/h) Category 5 (≥157 mph, ≥252 km/h) Unknown Storm type Tropical cyclone Subtropical cyclone Extratropical cyclone, remnant low, tropical disturbance, or monsoon depression

National Oceanic and Atmospheric Administration meteorologists David M. Roth and Hugh D. Cobb noted in 2000 that this storm may have originated from a tropical disturbance first noted over the southwestern Caribbean Sea on October 16. The track listed in the official hurricane database (HURDAT) for this cyclone begins about 110 mi (175 km) southwest of Jamaica on October 18, one day after Father Benito Viñes first reported a storm over the western Caribbean and one day before Kingston recorded 1.4 in (36 mm) of rain. Drifting northwestward as a cold front entered the Gulf of Mexico, the storm slowly strengthened, reaching hurricane status on October 20. Early the next day, the cyclone struck Cuba near Playa Mayabeque in present-day Mayabeque Province likely as a Category 2 hurricane, based on a 2000 reanalysis by Ramón Pérez Suárez. The system then accelerated northeastward due to deep southerly flow associated with the cold front. Emerging into the Straits of Florida later on October 21, the hurricane, then a Category 1, passed less than 20 mi (30 km) east of Florida on October 22.

The cyclone re-intensified into a Category 2 hurricane early on October 23 shortly before making landfall near Emerald Isle, North Carolina, with winds of 105 mph (165 km/h), based on sustained winds of 100 mph (155 km/h) at Cape Lookout, and an estimated barometric pressure of 963 mbar (28.4 inHg). Research conducted by meteorologists Gordon E. Dunn and Banner I. Miller in 1960 indicated that this storm reached major hurricane intensity. (Note: A major hurricane is a storm that ranks as Category 3 or higher on the Saffir–Simpson hurricane wind scale.) However, reanalysis by José Fernández-Partagás and Henry F. Diaz in 1995 and any since then have not found evidence to support this assertion, aside from sustained winds of 120 mph (190 km/h) at the top of Mount Washington in New Hampshire, but this is not considered to be representative of the cyclone's intensity because the summit is approximately 6,300 ft (1,900 m) above sea level. The hurricane raced across the interior of the United States until becoming extratropical over New York late on October 23 as it merged with a cold front. On the following day, the extratropical low re-emerged into the Atlantic and headed east-southeastward until dissipating on October 25 about halfway between Bermuda and Newfoundland.

Michael Chenoweth's 2014 reanalysis study suggested that this storm formed just north of Jamaica on October 13, moved slowly northwestward, and later crossed southern Florida from October 21 to early the next day before resuming a course similar to that shown in HURDAT.

== Impact ==
The hurricane killed at least 71 people and left $2 million in damage (1878 USD). The storm is believed to be the strongest storm to hit the Washington, D.C.–Baltimore region since hurricane records began in 1851.

=== Greater Antilles ===
In Jamaica, 1.4 in (36 mm) of rain fell in Kingston on October 19. Hurricane conditions and heavy rains impacted Cuba as far east as Cienfuegos. Buildings in Havana suffered significant damage and three schooners capsized offshore. The lowest atmospheric pressure reported was 1,005 mbar (29.67 inHg) on the afternoon of October 21, although observations were sporadic during the cyclone's passage over the island.

=== United States ===
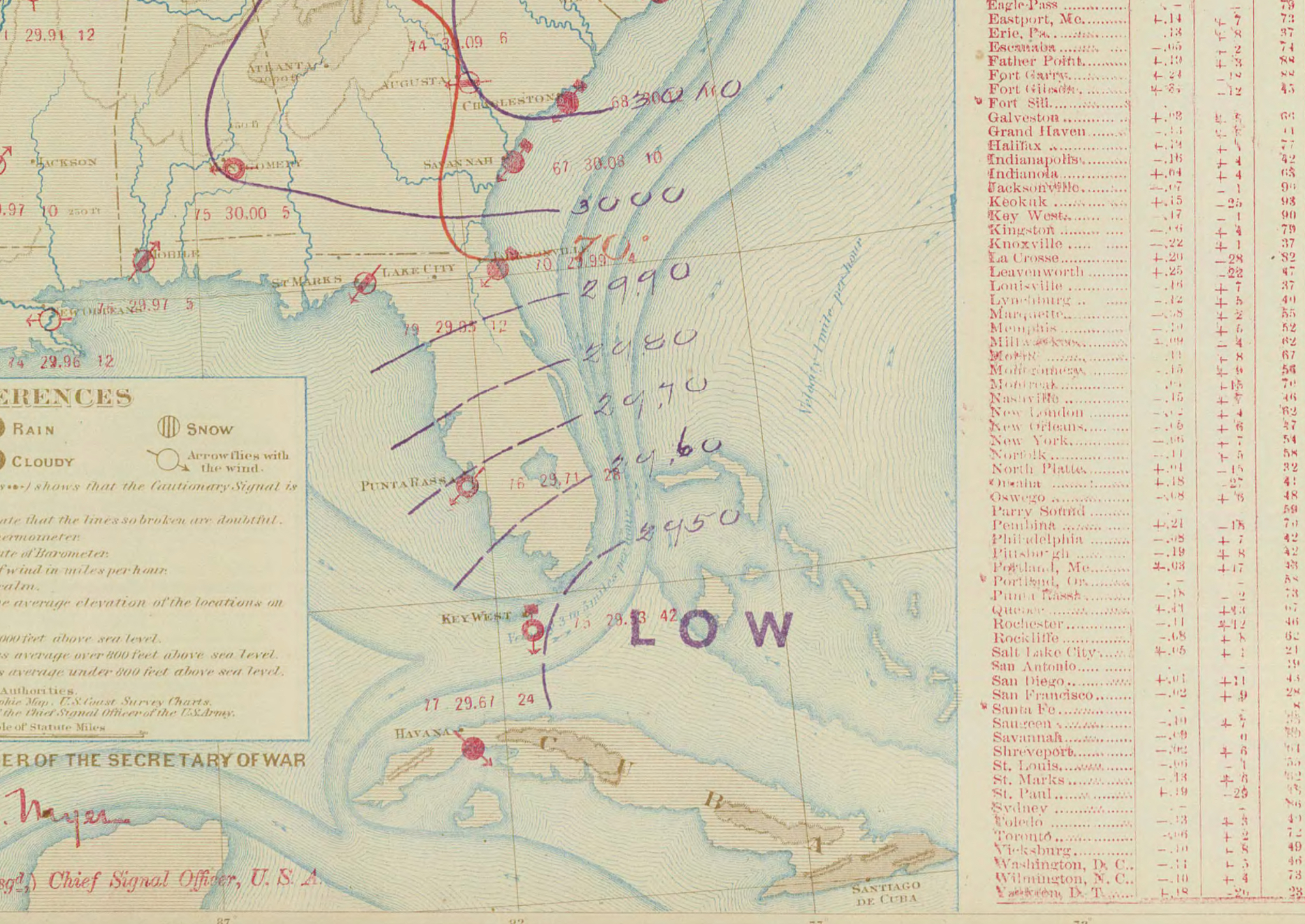
Weather map of the hurricane at its closest approach to South Florida on October 21

In Florida, Key West recorded sustained winds of 54 mph (87 km/h) and 4.83 in (123 mm) of precipitation, while Punta Rassa experienced high winds. Some vegetation sustained damage and a few fishing boats capsized in the former, but the height of the storm impacted Key West at low tide, limiting coastal flooding. The cyclone disrupted shipping activity along the state's east coast and grounded more than a dozen vessels from the Straits of Florida to Cape Canaveral. Georgia and South Carolina reported winds reaching almost gale-force and light rainfall. Offshore the latter, the crew of the bark Martha abandoned ship. The passage of the hurricane led to colder air reaching Louisiana, which contributed to the ending of a severe yellow fever epidemic in the New Orleans area.

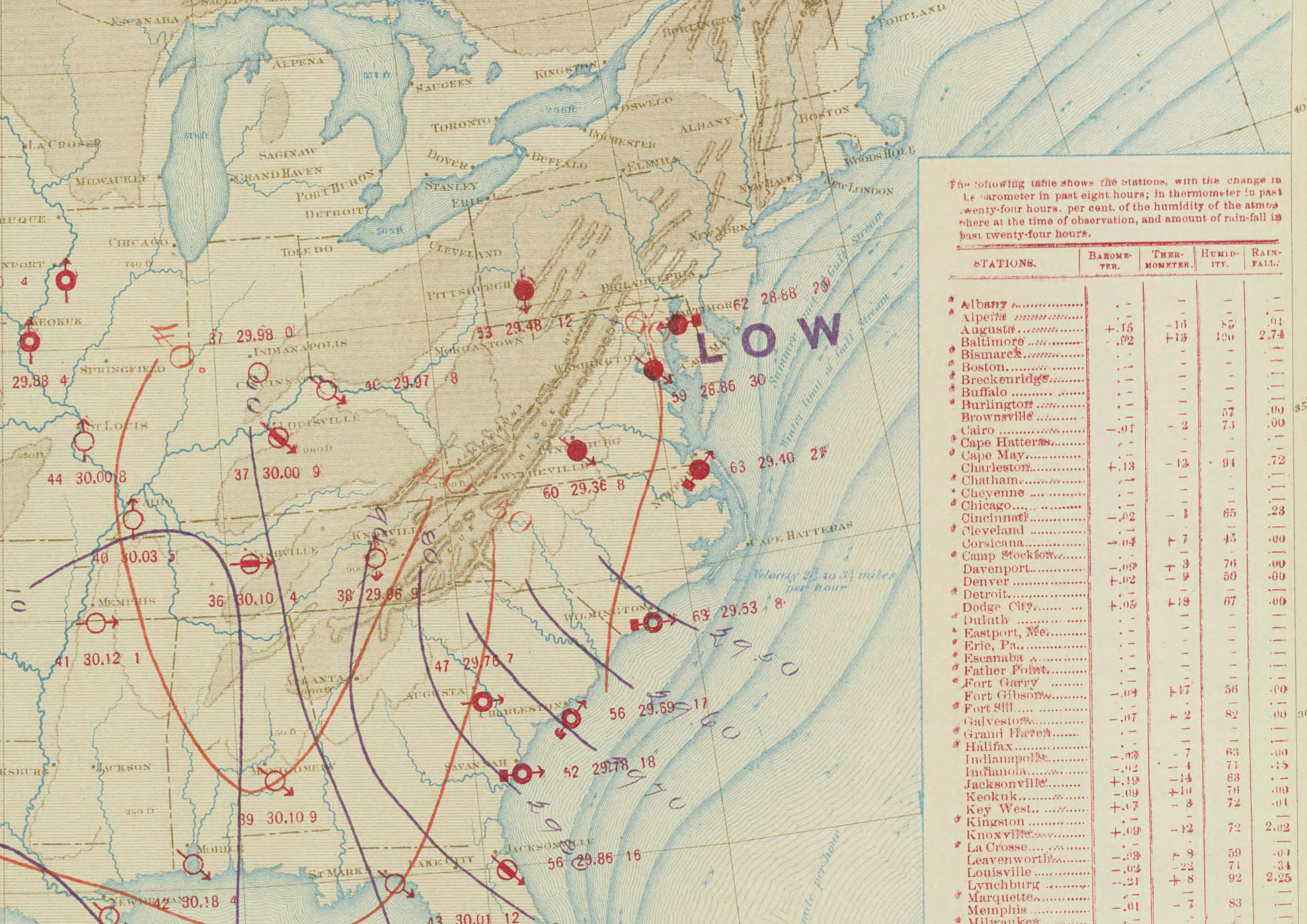
Weather map of the hurricane over the Mid-Atlantic in the afternoon on October 23

There were sustained wind speeds over 100 mph (160 km/h) recorded at Cape Lookout, North Carolina. Several ships and schooners sank during the storm, including the steamer City of Houston – valued at $200,000 – which was lost on Frying Pan Shoals. The captain of the schooner Mangolia drowned after the ship capsized in Albemarle Sound. Three other people perished after being washed overboard ships just offshore North Carolina. In Virginia, the hurricane damaged several weather stations and 19 sailors drowned when their ship, the A.S. Davis, was driven ashore at Virginia Beach during the storm. Two more people drowned in maritime incidents, one from the schooner Brewster and the other from the Everman. At least 22 vessels wrecked offshore Virginia as a result of the storm. Waves and abnormally high tides also completely inundated Cobb and Smith islands, washing away all livestock. There was heavy tree and building damage in Richmond. Structures in Norfolk suffered damage, including a few warehouses, several churches, and residences that were under construction. The storm also downed or damaged outhouses, shutters, signs, and trees.

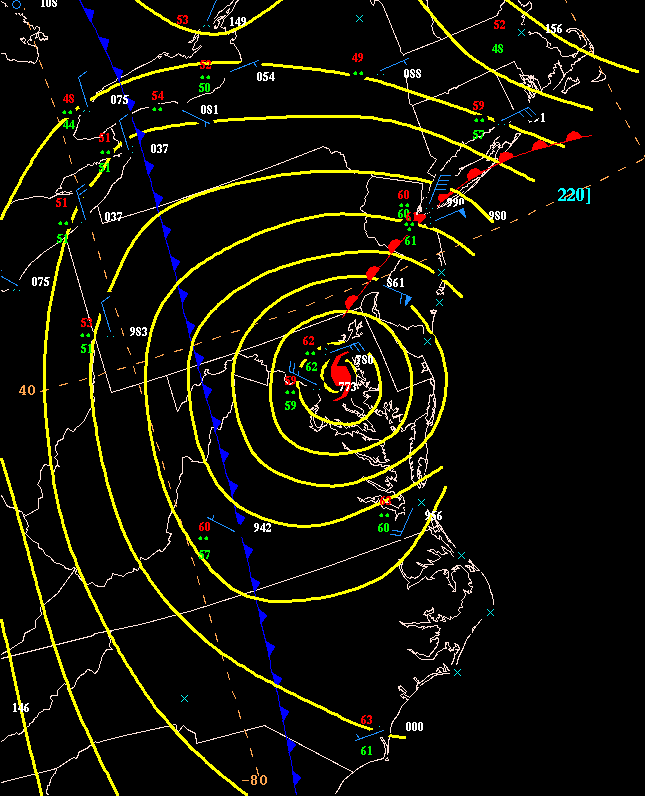
Reconstructed Weather Map of the hurricane over Maryland on October 23

Washington, D.C. experienced toppled trees and telegraph lines and deroofed structures, with some trees substantially damaged at Lafayette Square and the White House grounds. Rains washed out roads crossing the southern end of the Anacostia River at Stickfoot, inundated corn fields, and flooded basements, especially along Pennsylvania Avenue. In Maryland, the hurricane beached or wrecked several vessels in the Chesapeake Bay and adjacent waterways. This included the steamer Express, which observed a barometric pressure of 975 mbar (28.78 inHg) before wrecking near Point No Point in St. Mary's County, causing five deaths. The loss of the Express and its cargo totaled roughly $30,000. Strong winds on land disrupted nearly all communications by telegraph and damaged many residences, with several of those demolished. The wharves of Baltimore flooded, as did sections of the city around Jones Falls. Several buildings were inflicted with damage in Easton, including a church losing its spire.

In Delaware, numerous vessels foundered or wrecked in Delaware Bay, leading to fourteen deaths. Another four people died due to drowning at Leipsic. Wilmington, especially the southern parts of the city, was inundated due to tidal flooding along the Brandywine Creek, Christina River, and Delaware River. Water entered many structures, drowned dozens of cows, and damaged large quantities of crops. Winds toppled many telegraph wires and unroofed numerous buildings and destroyed several others. A letter published in the Daily Republican stated that wind damage occurred to awnings, chimneys, dwellings, shutters, signs, and trees in New Castle and that four homes were swept away after the Delaware River rose, some as far as 1.5 mi (0 km) from their original location. A fire destroyed a mill, for a loss of about $40,000. In Middletown, damage was done to the Presbyterian church, Episcopal church, and the Delmarva Drying House. The long bridge over the St. Augustine creek and surrounding marsh was destroyed.

A January 1879 report written by the United States Engineer Office of Philadelphia noted that "at Fort Delaware, many of the people living on the island barely escaped with their lives, the water rising 5 feet [1.52 meters] in an hour and a half" and that 31 buildings suffered water damage, 12 of which were destroyed. Delaware City was cut off from communications, while floodwaters inundated the southern parts of the city and winds unroofed several buildings. An accounted published by The Daily Gazette of Wilmington, Delaware, noted that at and around Bombay Hook, "the destruction of property has been immense, including nearly every corn shock, stack of hay, fodder, most of the poultry and much of the stock", while the railroad pier was nearly destroyed. Another church was destroyed in Frederica. Storm surge at Rehoboth Beach washed out a section of railroad track and carried away all bathhouses. Strong winds across Delaware downed many trees and fences and unroofed a number of buildings. Damage throughout the state totaled nearly $45,000.

Sustained winds in New Jersey as high as 84 mph (135 km/h) were reported at Cape May. There, tides extensively damaged Beach Drive and submerged the area being the city and the mainland, including the railroad track. Winds partly deroofed some buildings, while other structures and vessels were damaged. Severe damage occurred across the state, including many railroad lines being washed out, a few industrial plants being unroofed or otherwise suffering damage, and the toppling of the spire to the Fourth Presbyterian Church in Camden from strong winds. Throughout the town, the storm unroofed approximately 150 buildings and toppled many smoke stacks and telegraph wires, and demolished even some sturdy buildings. In Trenton, many buildings lost their roofs and a tower suffered major damage at John A. Roebling's Sons Company, which was then manufacturing the cables for the Brooklyn Bridge. The city reported about $25,000 in damage. Strong winds deroofed many structures in Wenonah, including a hotel. Storm surge lifted the Hereford Inlet Lighthouse from its foundations. At Port Elizabeth, breaches in the banks of the Maurice River made by the Gale of 76 were widened and made permanent creating large areas of marshland. Eight people died in New Jersey, six from ships capsizing or wrecking offshore and two from falling debris. In contrast, parts of the coast experienced reverse storm surge, making the Barnegat Inlet impassable.

Widespread damage occurred in Pennsylvania. The Philadelphia office of the Signal Corps, the predecessor to the National Weather Service, recorded atmospheric pressures as low as 986 mbar (29.12 inHg) and sustained winds of 72 mph (116 km/h) on October 23, toppling many oak trees in downtown. Severe flooding was also reported in Philadelphia, especially at League Island, where the Delaware and Schuylkill rivers intersect. A bridge over the Schuylkill River, valued at about $30,000, was carried away and the sloop Helen wrecked. About 80 families had to be rescued by row boats from the second floor of their dwellings from The Neck. At Fort Mifflin, located near where the Philadelphia International Airport stands today, all homes suffered flood damage and bridges were dragged away. Throughout Philadelphia, the hurricane caused nearly $2 million in damage and destroyed at least 700 buildings, including train sheds at a Pennsylvania Railroad railroad station, seven market houses, five railroad stations, four police precincts, and three street car stations. Nearly fifty churches lost their spires, while the Delaware Geological Survey noted that "23 churches and 70 factories, warehouses, mills, schools, markets, and depots were damaged". Seven people died in the city.

Near Pottstown, a bridge was washed away, resulting in $100,000 in damage, and nine boats capsized in that vicinity. Many structures were damaged in Chester and Scranton, with at least 90 buildings deroofed and 15 homes demolished in the former. Tidal flooding was also reported in Chester, damaging businesses and several vessels, capsizing five canal boats. A tornado in Wilkes-Barre lifted up a building, in addition to unroofing homes, shattering windows, uprooting trees, damaging fences, and destroying mining equipment. Railroad tracks in the town were washed out. Several churches in Harrisburg and Norristown. Buildings also lost their roofs in the former and mills and an oil refinery sustained damage in the latter. In Doylestown, the storm downed the steeple of a Catholic Church and damaged the Bucks County Courthouse. In Media, a person became trapped in the rubble of his home after it collapsed, but was rescued later on. Floodwaters in Williamsport submerged several streets and several parts of the Philadelphia and Erie Railroad in that vicinity. Overall, the hurricane caused approximately $2.14 million in damage and 12 fatalities in Pennsylvania, while also capsizing 17 vessels and substantially damaging 22 others.

In Ohio, the cyclone, combined with a pressure gradient, led to heavy rains and sustained winds up to 35 mph (56 km/h) in Cleveland. High tides along the coast of New York capsized two steamers, while winds caused some damage in the New York City area. This was mainly limited to downed trees, shattered windows, and toppled chimneys and telegraph poles. Piers and a few basements flooded near the East and Hudson rivers, while a barge capsized in the latter, causing an unspecified number of fatalities. At Coney Island, tides weakened the walls of a New York and Sea Beach Railroad station, damaged some restaurants and bathhouses, and destroyed several other bathhouses, a pier, and a few pavilions. The schooner Mary Tyce capsized along the Connecticut coast, causing two deaths. Newport and Providence in Rhode Island reported heavy rains and high winds, though little damage occurred. In Massachusetts, the storm, then an extratropical low, produced rainfall and sustained tropical storm-force winds in parts of the state. Twenty-four vessels were beached along the coast and the schooner Joseph Fitch was destroyed offshore Stonington. Vermont experienced gale-force winds, tossing fences and disrupting telegraphic communications. In the vicinity of Bath, New Hampshire, heavy rains elevated rivers, while winds damaged structures and trees. Maine recorded up to 6.3 in (160 mm) of rain in Oakland (then known as West Waterville), the highest known precipitation total associated with the hurricane. The Saco River rose more than 7 ft (2.1 m) at Biddeford. However, this was beneficial, especially for the manufacturing industry, as operations at mills had previously been suspended for two weeks because the height of the river was too low.

== Eyewitness to the storm ==
Mr. Bolton, an employee of the U.S. Signal Service, described the storm fury as he tried to fix one of the weather stations; "....I was at the station when the gale, which proved so disastrous to human life commenced. A severe rain storm has prevailed all day Tuesday (22nd) but the gale did not reach the station until 9 p.m. It rapidly increased in velocity until it almost became a hurricane. The members of the crew at this station, whose duty it is to patrol the beach that night, performed their duties with the utmost difficulty, as they could scarcely make any headway against it, and often had to cling to some stationary object like a telephone pole to prevent themselves from being carried away at the mercy of the fearful tempest..."

The station employee also described when the A.S. Davis ran aground during the storm: "....The debris was thickly scattered along the beach for a distance of fully 4 miles....I proceeded to Cape Henry, Virginia to assist the Signal Officer there. The body of one of the crew was there. About 1 ½ miles south of Cape Henry the bodies of eleven of the crew had been washed ashore.....During the heaviest part of the gale, the wind at Kitty Hawk, North Carolina registered 100 mph. The instrument itself was finally blown away and therefore no further record was made. It was the severest gale that had occurred on this coast for sometime."

== See also ==
- List of New England hurricanes
- List of New Jersey hurricanes
- List of Virginia hurricanes
