= Hurricane Connie =

Category 4 Atlantic hurricane in 1955

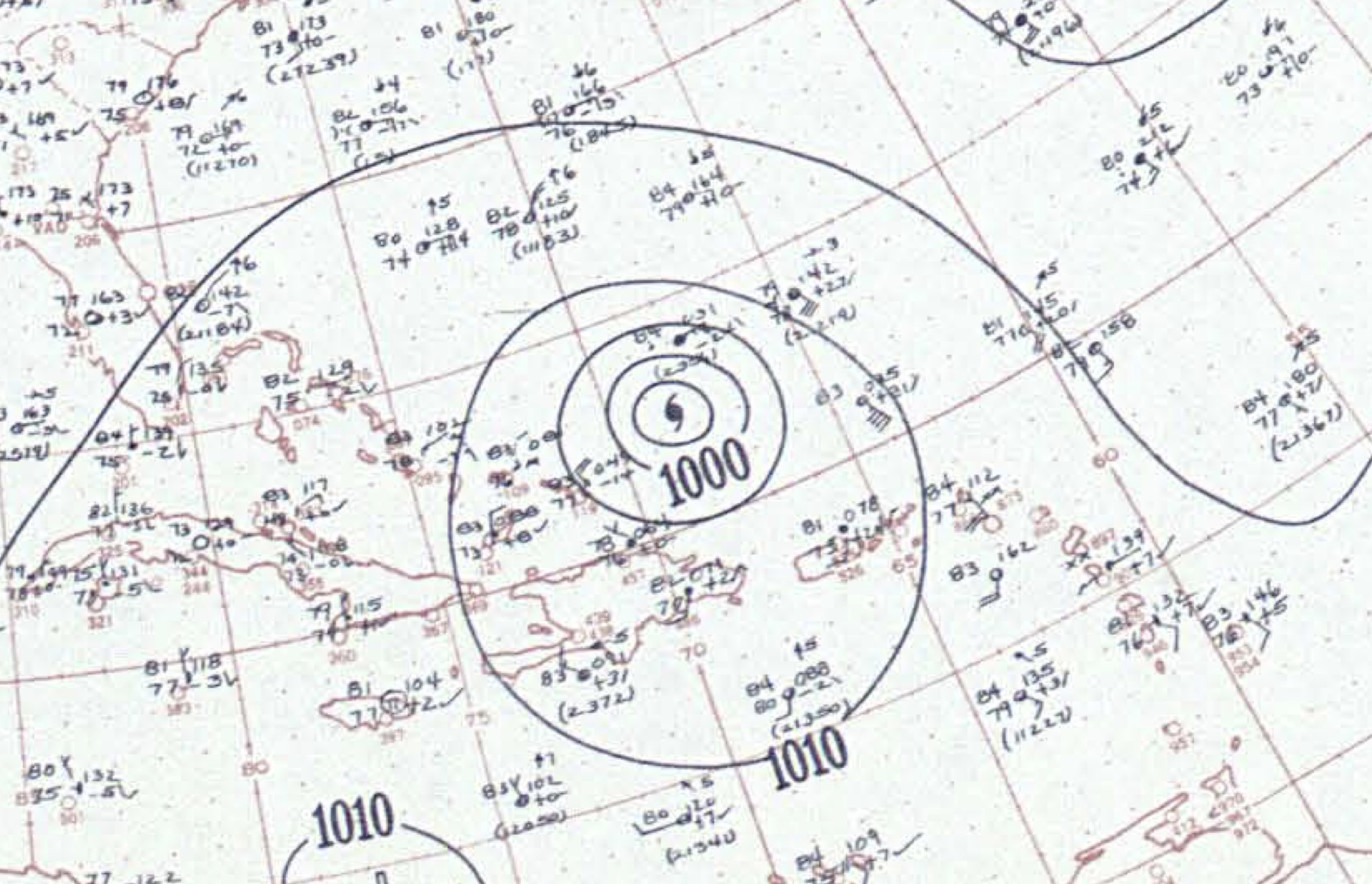
- Surface weather map of Hurricane Connie at peak intensity on August 7

Meteorological history
- Formed: August 3, 1955
- Dissipated: August 15, 1955

Category 4 major hurricane
- 1-minute sustained (SSHWS/NWS)
- Highest winds: 140 mph (220 km/h)
- Lowest pressure: 944 mbar (hPa); 27.88 inHg

Overall effects
- Fatalities: 77
- Damage: $86 million (1955 USD)
- Areas affected: Leeward Islands, Puerto Rico, North Carolina, Mid-Atlantic states, New England, Midwestern United States, Ontario
- IBTrACS
- Part of the 1955 Atlantic hurricane season

Hurricane Connie was a Category 4 hurricane that contributed to significant flooding across the eastern United States in August 1955, just days before Hurricane Diane affected the same general area. Connie formed on August 3 from a tropical wave in the eastern Atlantic Ocean. It moved quickly west-northwestward, strengthening into a hurricane by August 4. Connie first posed a threat to the Lesser Antilles, ultimately passing about 105 mi (169 km) north of the island group. In the United States Virgin Islands, three people died due to the hurricane, and a few homes were destroyed. The outer rainbands produced hurricane-force wind gusts and intense precipitation, reaching 8.65 in (220 mm) in Puerto Rico. On the island, Connie destroyed 60 homes and caused crop damage. After affecting Puerto Rico, Connie reached maximum sustained winds of 140 mph (230 km/h), and a barometric pressure of 944 mbar (27.9 inHg), as observed by the Hurricane Hunters on August 7. The hurricane later weakened, slowed its forward motion, and turned to the north, striking North Carolina on August 12 as a Category 2 on the Saffir-Simpson scale. Connie was the first of three damaging tropical cyclones in the 1955 hurricane season to hit the state, along with Diane and Ione. The storm progressed inland after moving through the Chesapeake Bay region, and was later absorbed by a cold front over Lake Huron on August 15.

Ahead of the storm, the United States Weather Bureau issued widespread hurricane warnings, spurring evacuations, flight cancelations, and beach closures. Connie produced strong winds, high tides, and heavy rainfall as it moved ashore, causing heavy crop damage and 27 deaths in North Carolina. Four people were killed in Washington, D.C. due to a traffic accident caused by slick roads. In Chesapeake Bay, Connie capsized a boat, killing 14 people and prompting a change in Coast Guard regulations. There were six deaths each in Pennsylvania and New Jersey, and 14 deaths in New York, where record rainfall flooded houses and subways. At least 295,000 people nationwide lost electric power during the storm. Damage in the United States totaled around $86 million (1955 USD). (Note: All damage totals are in 1955 United States dollars unless otherwise noted.) The rains from Connie contributed to flooding from Hurricane Diane that caused $700 million in damage. The remnants of Connie killed three people in Ontario, and also destroyed a few houses and boats in the province. As a result of its impacts, including a death toll of 77, the name Connie was retired from the Atlantic hurricane naming list.

== Meteorological history ==
Map plotting the storm's track and intensity, according to the Saffir–Simpson scale Map key Saffir–Simpson scale Tropical depression (≤38 mph, ≤62 km/h) Tropical storm (39–73 mph, 63–118 km/h) Category 1 (74–95 mph, 119–153 km/h) Category 2 (96–110 mph, 154–177 km/h) Category 3 (111–129 mph, 178–208 km/h) Category 4 (130–156 mph, 209–251 km/h) Category 5 (≥157 mph, ≥252 km/h) Unknown Storm type Tropical cyclone Subtropical cyclone Extratropical cyclone, remnant low, tropical disturbance, or monsoon depression

A tropical wave developed into a tropical depression to the west of the Cape Verde islands on August 3, 1955, based on reports from two nearby ships. The depression moved quickly west-northwestward and intensified into Tropical Storm Connie. A Hurricane Hunters flight on August 4 reported a developing eye feature. Observations from the flight, as well as a nearby ship, suggested that Connie attained hurricane status on August 4. The hurricane continued to intensify as it approached the northern Lesser Antilles, passing about 105 mi (169 km) north of the island group on August 6. Later that day, the storm strengthened to major hurricane status, or a Category 3 on the Saffir-Simpson scale.

After passing the Lesser Antilles, Connie turned more to the northwest as it rounded a large ridge. A Hurricane Hunters flight on August 7 observed an eye shaped like an inverted cone – larger at flight-level, and a diameter of 9 mi (14 km) at the surface. The plane also observed a minimum barometric pressure of 944 mbar (27.88 inHg), the lowest in association with the hurricane. Based on the observations, the Hurricane Research Division estimated maximum sustained winds of 140 mph (230 km/h), making Connie a Category 4 hurricane.

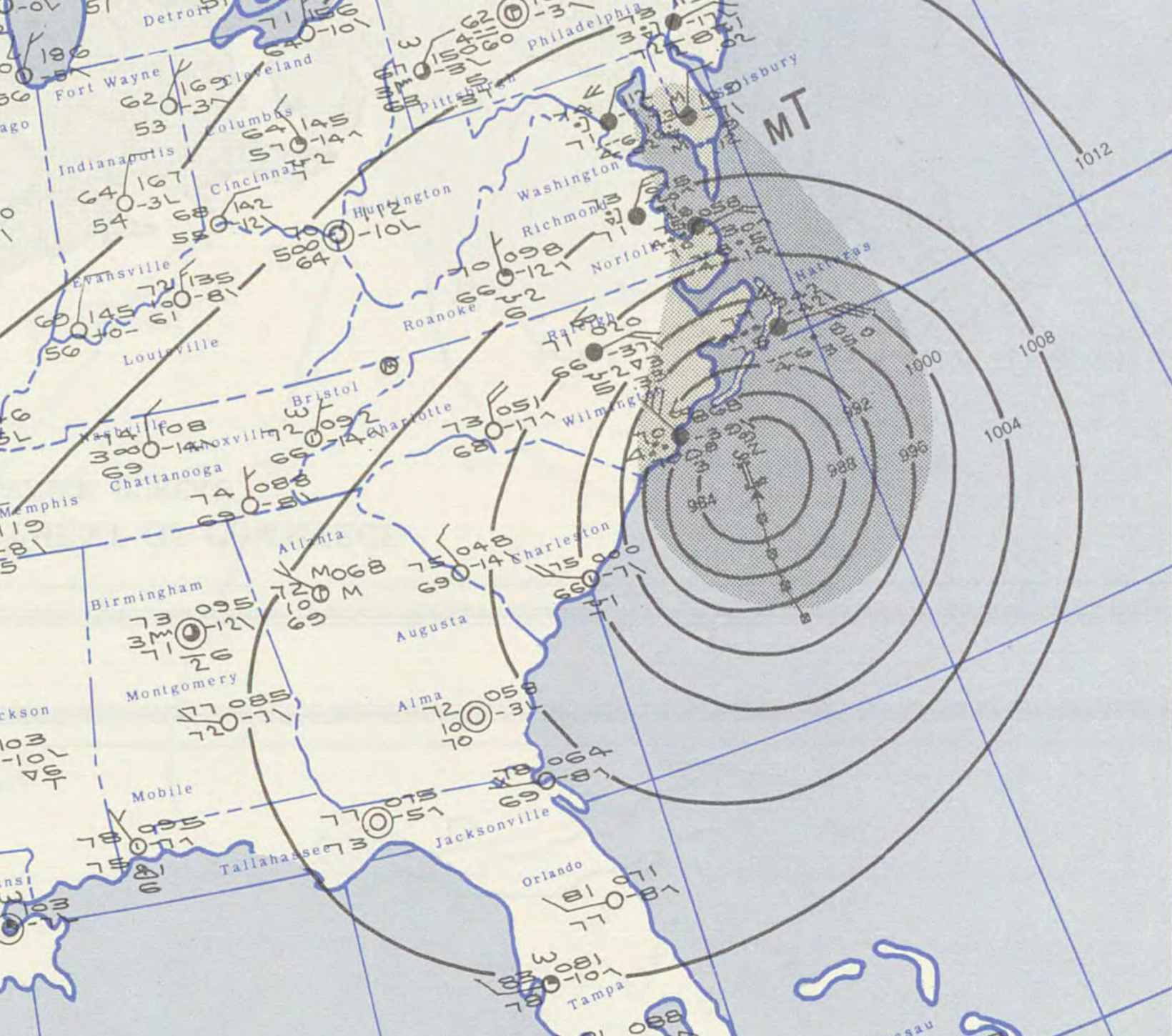
Surface weather map of Hurricane Connie shortly before landfall in North Carolina on August 12

The hurricane progressed northwestward, passing northeast of The Bahamas. The eye grew in size, and the combination of upwelling and cooler air resulted in weakening. Connie fell below major hurricane status on August 9. A building ridge to its northeast, as well as some interaction with developing Hurricane Diane to its southeast, caused Connie to move slower toward the west-northwest. On August 10, the hurricane turned to the north as it moved toward the southeast United States coast. On August 12, Connie restrengthened slightly, reaching a secondary peak intensity of 100 mph (160 km/h). The hurricane made landfall near Fort Macon State Park in North Carolina at that intensity around 15:00 UTC.

Hurricane Connie weakened as it moved through eastern North Carolina. The storm approached the Atlantic coast near the North Carolina/Virginia border. After passing through the Hampton Roads area, Connie turned back to the north-northwest, steered by a strengthening upper-level trough and low, located over Illinois. On August 13, Connie fell below hurricane intensity as it moved through the Chesapeake Bay region. The track shifted to the northwest, and Connie moved across western Pennsylvania, into Lake Erie. While still a tropical storm, Connie moved across portions of Southwestern Ontario, Lake Huron, and Michigan. On August 15, an approaching cold front absorbed the dissipating storm.

== Preparations ==
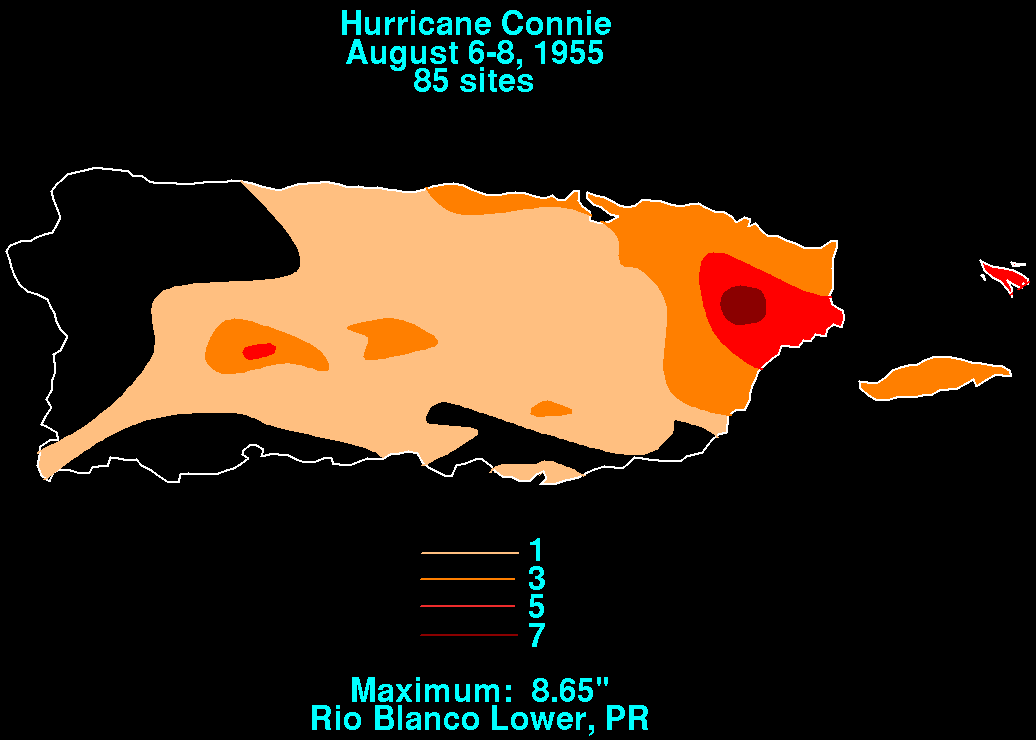
Connie rainfall in Puerto Rico

On August 5, Hurricane Connie began to become an apparent threat to the northeastern Caribbean Islands, with maximum winds in the storm reaching 125 mph (201 km/h). The National Weather Bureau issued hurricane warnings for Barbuda, Saba and Antigua. The Virgin Islands and Puerto Rico were placed on hurricane alert as warnings were possible later that day. Along the northern coast of Puerto Rico, the threat of Connie forced 40,000 people to evacuate their homes. After Connie affected Puerto Rico, a storm warning was issued for the northern coast of the Dominican Republic, and a hurricane warning was issued for the eastern Bahamas.

While Connie was meandering in the western Atlantic Ocean, its potential track posed problems for forecasters, due to its slow movement near the southeast United States coastline. On August 7, a hurricane warning was issued from North Carolina to Norfolk, Virginia, with a hurricane alert issued farther north to New York City. The Weather Bureau later extended the hurricane warnings to Delaware Breakwater, with storm warnings farther northeast to Provincetown, Massachusetts. The alert for North Carolina was up for about three days until Connie moved inland.

Ahead of the storm, the United States military flew its planes away from the coast to safer shelters further inland. Two people were killed when they crashed the Navy plane they were evacuating. Large Naval ships rode out the storm at sea, while smaller vessels anchored in Tangier. More than 100 merchant vessels from a dozen counties anchored in the waters of Hampton Roads, or while small boats were secured at port. The American Red Cross opened at least 79 shelters, and mobilized 41 officials with hurricane experience. The Coast Guard ordered four towns along beaches to evacuate, and overall about 14,000 people evacuated the coastline. About 2,000 people evacuated from flood-prone areas in New Bern, North Carolina. In Philadelphia, the Boy Scouts evacuated 800 scouts from Camp Delmont due to the threat of the hurricane. The threat of Connie also canceled a flight by President Dwight Eisenhower from Gettysburg to Washington, D.C., prompting him to travel instead by car. More than 300 residents evacuated in North Jersey. Beaches were closed in New Jersey and New York. An annual parade in Ocean City, New Jersey, was postponed due to the storm. Dozens of flights in and out of the New York area were canceled due to weather conditions. The storm also prompted the Canadian Army to halt military exercises.

== Impact ==
=== Caribbean ===
As the hurricane passed north of the Lesser Antilles, the outer rainbands of Connie produced wind gusts as high as 104 mph (167 km/h) on Tortola in the British Virgin Islands. On Anguilla, sustained winds reached 51 mph (82 km/h). Wind gusts reached 46 mph (74 km/h) in Puerto Rico and the United States Virgin Islands, although there were estimates of 80 mph (130 km/h) wind gusts on Saint Thomas. The outer rainbands of Connie also produced heavy rainfall in the northeastern Caribbean. The highest precipitation total in Puerto Rico was 8.65 in (220 mm) along the lower Río Blanco, of which 7.50 in (191 mm) fell in one day. Rainfall reached 7.04 in (179 mm) in Charlotte Amalie on Saint Thomas. Two people drowned on the island, and one person was electrocuted due to Connie's passage. The hurricane also destroyed a few shacks and boats on Saint Thomas. In Puerto Rico, high winds and waves destroyed 60 poorly built houses. Connie also damaged crops and utilities in Puerto Rico. Later, San Salvador Island in the Bahamas reported winds of 24 mph (39 km/h).

=== United States and Canada ===
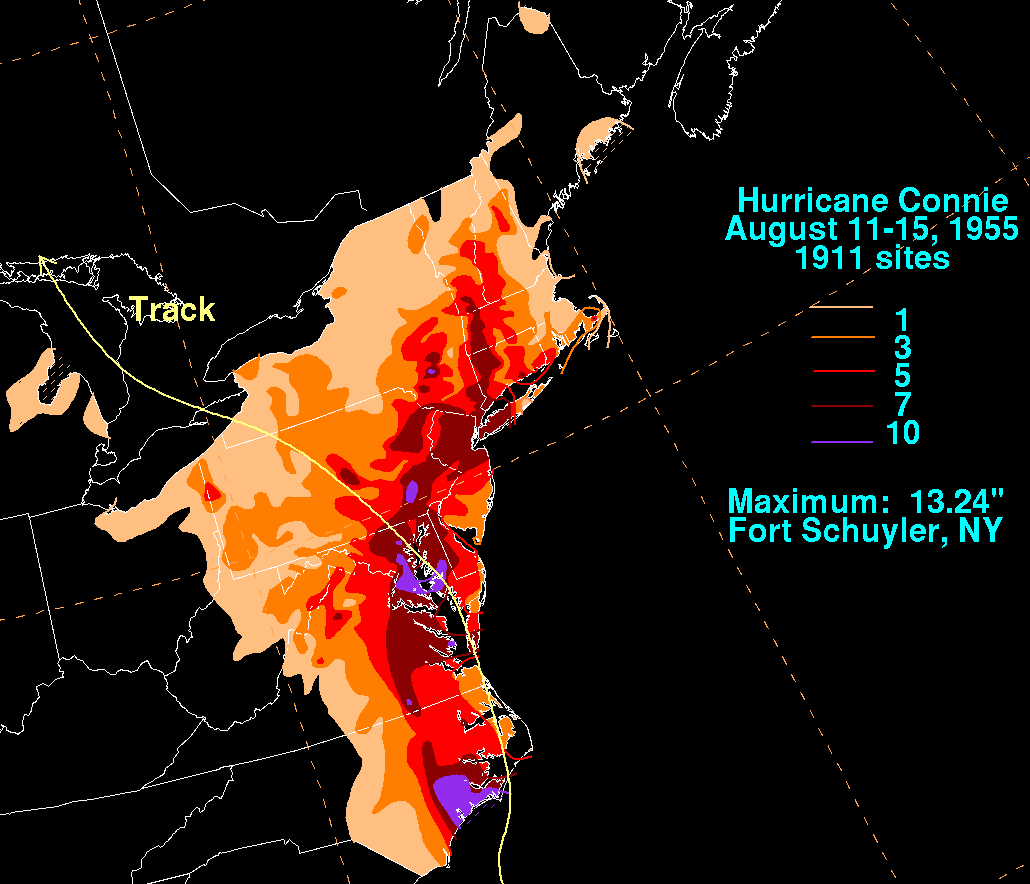
Rainfall map from Connie in the United States

Hurricane Connie produced hurricane-force winds in North Carolina and Virginia. Across the Northeastern United States, many areas were in drought conditions before the storm struck. Unusually moist air caused above normal air and water temperatures, resulting in heavy rainfall across the eastern United States. Storm-related rainfall spread from the South Carolina, northeast to Maine, and as far west as Michigan. Record rainfall occurred in Philadelphia and New York City, and the highest precipitation related to Connie was 13.24 in (336 mm) at Fort Schuyler in New York.Connie's rains preceded additional rainfall from Hurricane Diane just four days later, which together caused widespread flooding. Along Connie's western periphery, the rainbands spawned at least six tornadoes, of which five in South Carolina and one in North Carolina. Damage from Connie in the United States was estimated at $86,065,000, mostly in North Carolina, Virginia, and Maryland.

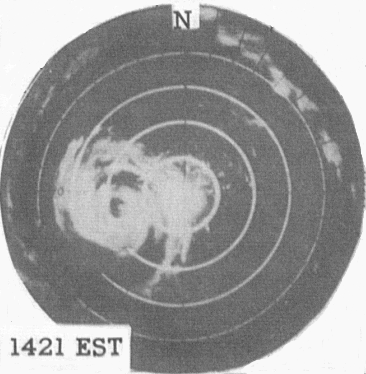
Connie west of Cape Hatteras, North Carolina

When Connie struck North Carolina, it produced sustained winds of 72 mph (116 km/h) in Morehead City, with gusts to 83 mph (134 km/h). Wind gusts near where the hurricane moved ashore reached 100 mph (160 km/h), although it was uncertain whether the gust was estimated or measured. Frying Pan Shoals, located offshore, reported a gust of 92 mph (148 km/h). The hurricane produced tides up to 8 ft (2.4 m) above normal while moving slowly ashore, which resulted in significant beach erosion. Tides were higher at Swansboro, North Carolina than during Hurricane Hazel the previous October, and many piers that were rebuilt after Hazel were damaged or again destroyed by Connie. The storm surge flooded low-lying portions of Wilmington. High waves in advance of the storm flooded coastal roads along the Outer Banks. Rainfall amounts of over 10 in (250 mm) in the area west of where Connie made landfall. Stream flooding occurred as far inland as Raleigh, but was most significant near the coast. Along the Pamlico River in Washington, National Guardsmen were ordered to help about 1,000 people evacuate during the storm. Outer rainbands knocked out power lines in coastal North Carolina. Flooding-induced rainfall closed U.S. Route 17 near New Bern. Throughout North Carolina, the hurricane caused about $40 million in damage, of which about 75% was from crop damage. There were 27 deaths in the state related to Connie, including traffic deaths, drownings, people in damaged buildings, and electrocutions.

In South Carolina to the south of the center, the hurricane destroyed 40 buildings in Myrtle Beach, South Carolina. Connie also damaged fishing piers, breakwaters, and housing shingles. Newspapers considered the damage "mild" compared to that from Hazel the previous year. As Connie progressed northward, it continued to drop significant amounts of precipitation. Totals of over 10 in (250 mm) were reported on both sides of Chesapeake Bay, in Pennsylvania, and in southeastern New York. Rainfall in Richmond, Virginia, totaled 8.79 in (223 mm) on August 12, breaking the day's precipitation record. Severe river flooding occurred in Virginia, from the coast inland to Richmond. Floods washed out a portion of the Richmond, Fredericksburg and Potomac Railroad near Lankford, and covered portions of five area highways, including U.S. 1 and U.S. 301. The storm downed trees and caused scattered power outages for at least 5,000 people in the state. Ten river gauges in Virginia, as well as sixteen in neighboring Maryland, reached the highest stage on record. More than 100 traffic accidents occurred in Washington D.C. due to slick roads; one accident killed four people, after a car was sideswiped and knocked into a swollen creek where the occupants drowned.

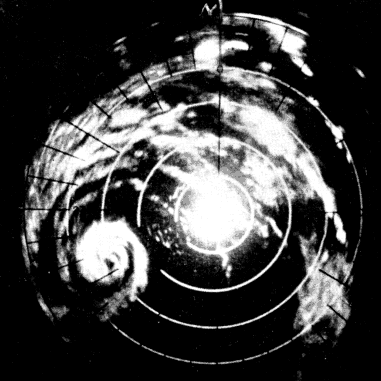
Radar image of Connie in the Northeastern United States

The combination of strong winds and high waves wrecked a 125 ft (38 m) schooner in the Chesapeake Bay named the Levin J. Marvel. The 64-year old boat was described as "unseaworthy" when it left from Annapolis, Maryland, and capsized near Fairhaven. Of the 23 passengers and four crew members, 14 people drowned, making it "one of the worst maritime calamities in the history of Tidewater Maryland", as described by The Baltimore Sun. The other passengers were later rescued after holding onto wreckage.

Farther from the storm's immediate landfall, Connie's precipitation was beneficial Delaware due to prior drought conditions. Wind gusts in the state reached 60 mph (97 km/h) on a control tower at the New Castle County Airport. The storm spawned a waterspout in Bethany Beach, which knocked off the roofs of a dozen homes, caused a six-hour power outage, and caused a minor injury when a teenager was flown 60 ft (18 m). The rains caused flooding that was described as "inconsequential" by the United States Geological Survey, due to preceding drought conditions. There were six storm deaths in New Jersey – one by drowning, one by electrocution, and four in traffic accidents. The winds and rains knocked down trees and power lines, leaving about 180,000 people without power, and about 20,000 people without phone service. Nearly every police and fire department in Bergen County, along with over 500 electricians, responded to the outages. Manville declared a state of emergency that lasted for 19.5 hours, after three nearby rivers exceeded their banks. A nun in Tenafly required rescue from a trapped elevator during a power outage. Flooding closed portions of the White Horse Pike and other roads near Camden, causing traffic jams. There were also six deaths in neighboring Pennsylvania – four due to traffic accidents, and two people in their cars swept away by floods. Rainfall reached 9 in (230 mm) in southeastern Pennsylvania, with 4.83 in (123 mm) recorded in Philadelphia over a 24-hour period; it was the city's highest daily rainfall in 57 years. The deluge exceeded the capacity of sewers and creeks, closed roads, and entered the basements of homes, forcing hundreds of residents to evacuate. Three days' of rainfall caused creeks to rise in the Lehigh Valley. About 10,000 people lost power in Pennsylvania, but service was quickly restored. U.S. Marines evacuated a group of 63 Girl Scouts from Camp Helena near Bethlehem, Pennsylvania, after floods from a nearby creek threatened the group. A boy required rescue from the flooded Darby Creek.

Heavy rainfall, totaling over 10 in (250 mm) affected southeastern New York, causing heavy damage, and killing 11 people in the New York metropolitan area, and three people upstate. Hurricane Connie brought the heaviest rain seen in New York City in over 50 years, totaling 5.32 in (135 mm) within a 20-hour span. Large areas of the city were flooded, inundating subways and thousands of houses. About 100,000 people lost power in the city. High winds and tides from the storm cancelled ferry service, and forced LaGuardia Airport to temporarily shut down after flooding reached 1 ft (0.30 m) deep. Flooding washed out a portion of the Delaware and Hudson Railway in the Helderberg Mountains, causing two trains to derail; there were no injuries. In Monroe and Wayne counties, the storm damaged the peach and apple crops. The Chenango County Fair closed early due to the storms' rains. In coastal Connecticut, the rainfall from Connie increased levels along streams, but there was little damage.

When the remnants of Connie entered Ontario on August 14, it continued to produce winds of up to 46 mph (74 km/h), and the storm dropped 2.56 in (65 mm) of rainfall near the Great Lakes. In Burlington, 27 boats were destroyed, and one fisherman drowned in Lake Erie after his boat sank during the storm. Two other people drowned in the province. Connie destroyed six houses and damaged several others due to high waves. The storm also caused power outages and damage to the tobacco crop. Late in the storm's path through the United States, Connie produced wind gusts of 65 mph (105 km/h) along Lake Huron in Michigan, causing high waves that damaged or sank many small boats. Damage in Michigan was estimated at $150,000.

== Aftermath ==
Newsreel video clip of Hurricane Connie in North Carolina

Flooding caused by Connie generally did not attract much media attention; however, the floods were important in setting the conditions for later significant flooding across the Northeastern United States. Just five days after Connie struck North Carolina, Hurricane Diane affected the same area, but instead of continuing to the northwest it turned to the northeast. Diane produced further rainfall in already wet areas from Connie. Damage from Diane totaled at least $700 million, and six states were declared federal disaster areas from the combined hurricanes' impact; this allowed federal assistance for the affected areas. Immediately after the storm, the U.S. Small Business Administration authorized low-interest loans for homes and businesses affected by Connie.

The loss of the Levin J. Marvel during the hurricane prompted the United States Congress to pass a law in 1956, which allowed the Coast Guard to inspect all vessels with more than six passengers; the previous law only allowed inspections for boats of more than 700 tons, much higher than the 183 tons that the Marvel displaced. The inexperienced captain was charged with negligence and manslaughter and stood trial before the United States District Court for the District of Maryland in Baltimore. Those charges carried a prison term of 11 years. Judge Robert Dorsey Watkins, however, acquitted him of the manslaughter charge, instead sentencing him to one-year probation for negligence.

Due to its destructive impact and high death toll, the name Connie was retired from the Atlantic hurricane naming list by the U.S. Weather Bureau after the 1955 season. It was one of four names retired from that year.

== See also ==
- List of North Carolina hurricanes (1950–1979)
- List of Virginia hurricanes
- 1933 Chesapeake–Potomac hurricane – one of the most damaging hurricanes in the Mid-Atlantic
- Hurricane Isabel – a hurricane in 2003 that also struck North Carolina and also moved over the Great Lakes
