= Hurricane Able (1952) =

Category 2 Atlantic hurricane in 1952

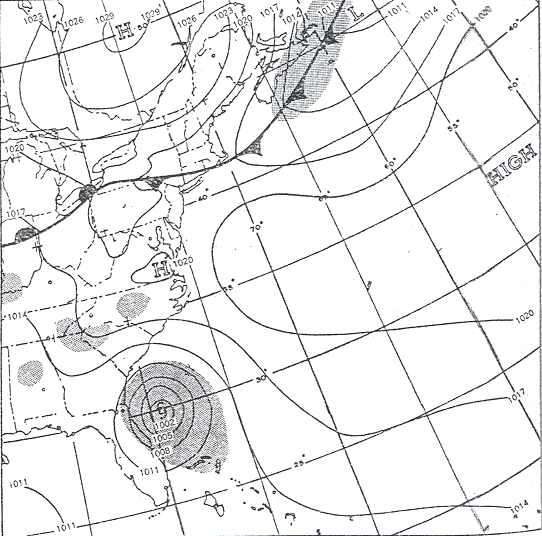
- Surface weather map of Able prior to it striking South Carolina

Meteorological history
- Formed: August 18, 1952
- Dissipated: September 2, 1952

Category 2 hurricane
- 1-minute sustained (SSHWS/NWS)
- Highest winds: 100 mph (155 km/h)
- Lowest pressure: 980 mbar (hPa); 28.94 inHg

Overall effects
- Fatalities: 3 indirect
- Damage: $2.75 million (1952 USD)
- Areas affected: East Coast of the United States (South Carolina landfall)
- IBTrACS
- Part of the 1952 Atlantic hurricane season

Hurricane Able was the only hurricane to make landfall in the United States in the 1952 season. Forming on August 18 off the west coast of Africa, Able moved generally west- to west-northwestward for much of its duration. It was first observed by the Hurricane Hunters on August 25 to the north of the Lesser Antilles. Two days later, Able attained hurricane status, and on August 30 it turned sharply to the north-northwest in response to a cold front. The hurricane reached peak winds of 100 mph (160 km/h) just prior to moving ashore near Beaufort, South Carolina on August 31. Although it quickly weakened below hurricane force, Able maintained tropical storm force for almost two days over land, eventually dissipating over Maine on September 2.

The threat of the storm prompted hurricane warnings in the southeastern United States, resulting in the evacuation of tourists on Labor Day Weekend. Able produced heavy rainfall from Florida through New England, which caused widespread flooding. The city struck by the hurricane was heavily damaged and briefly isolated due to downed power and telephone lines. Overall damage in the United States totaled $2.75 million (1952 USD, $32.6 million 2025 USD), mostly from crop damage in South Carolina. Further north, Able produced flooding and gusty winds, which washed out a portion of the Baltimore and Ohio Railroad.

== Meteorological history ==
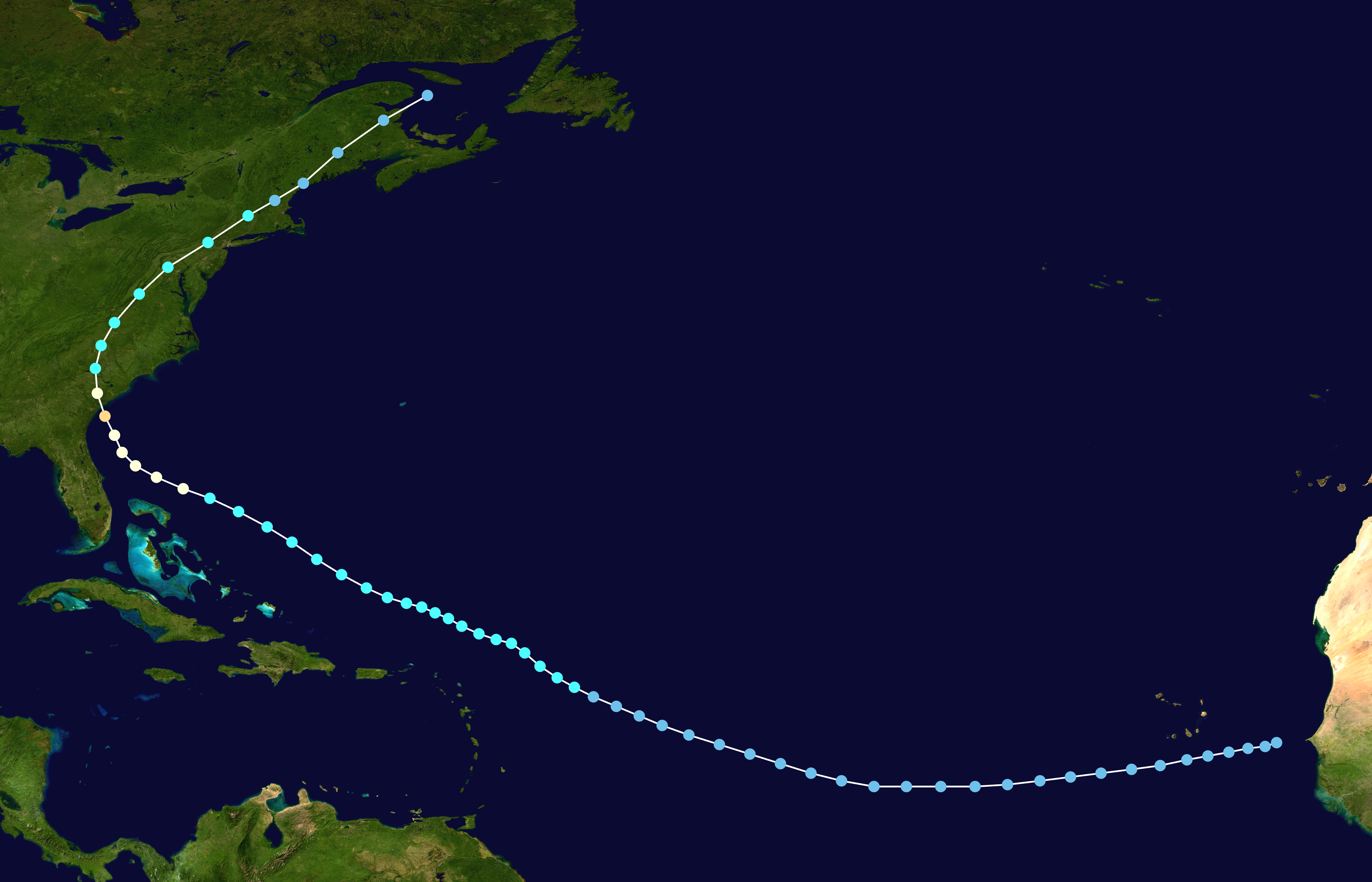
Map plotting the storm's track and intensity, according to the Saffir–Simpson scale Map key Saffir–Simpson scale Tropical depression (≤38 mph, ≤62 km/h) Tropical storm (39–73 mph, 63–118 km/h) Category 1 (74–95 mph, 119–153 km/h) Category 2 (96–110 mph, 154–177 km/h) Category 3 (111–129 mph, 178–208 km/h) Category 4 (130–156 mph, 209–251 km/h) Category 5 (≥157 mph, ≥252 km/h) Unknown Storm type Tropical cyclone Subtropical cyclone Extratropical cyclone, remnant low, tropical disturbance, or monsoon depression

A tropical depression developed between the Cape Verde islands and the west coast of Africa on August 18, although it was not classified as a tropical cyclone for another week. The depression tracked west-southwestward for three days, followed by a turn to the west and later west-northwest. Late on August 24 it intensified into a tropical storm about 700 mi (1100 km) east-northeast of Guadeloupe in the Lesser Antilles. The next day, the Miami Weather Bureau Office initiated advisories on Tropical Storm Able after the Hurricane Hunters confirmed the presence of a poorly defined center. Continuing to the west-northwest, the storm passed north of Puerto Rico and attained hurricane status on August 27.

After reaching hurricane status, Able tracked west-northwest and gradually intensified. The lowest pressure in relation to the storm, 998 mbar, was reported shortly after it attained hurricane status. After reaching a position about 130 mi (210 km) east of Jacksonville, Florida on August 30, Able slowed and turned to the north-northwest due to an approaching cold front. By that time, the Hurricane Hunters reported a well-defined eye, and the next day estimated winds of 125 mph (200 km/h) as they reported concentric eyewalls. Officially, the strongest winds in Able were 100 mph (160 km/h), attained early on August 31. At 0300 UTC that day, the hurricane made landfall in a sparsely populated area near Beaufort, South Carolina, where the pressure was unofficially reported as 980 mbar.

As the hurricane turned north and northeastward over land, the winds quickly weakened to tropical storm force, although Able maintained winds of at least 40 mph (64 km/h) through North Carolina, Virginia, and Maryland. Able was able to retain its intensity over land for so long because it remained over the flat terrain east of the Appalachian Mountains in addition to retaining a plume of tropical moisture from its south. After the storm weakened to a tropical depression, it still produced 50 mph (80 km/h) gusts as it crossed Pennsylvania through New England. Late on September 2, the circulation of Able dissipated near Portland, Maine.

== Preparations and impact ==
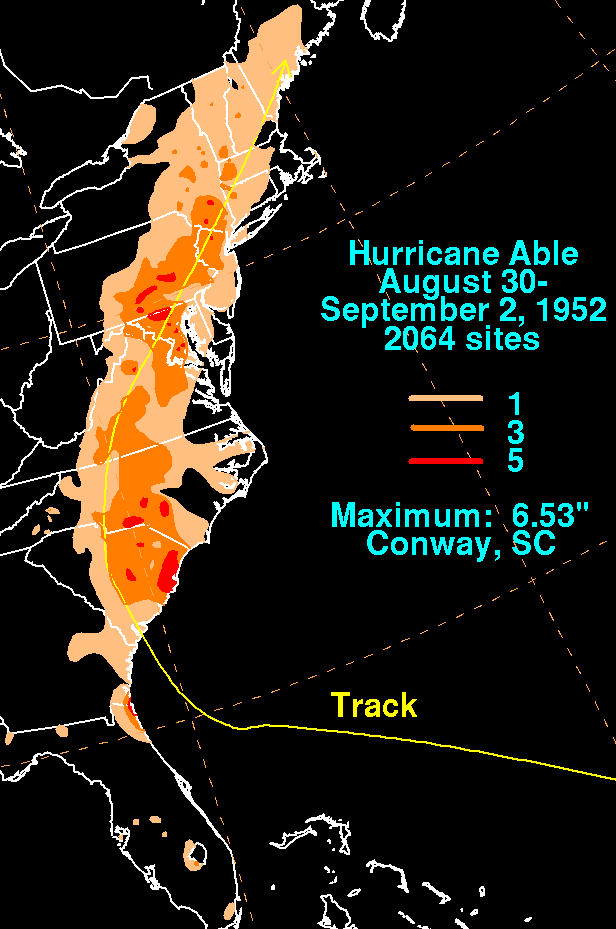
Rainfall map of Hurricane Able

As the hurricane approached the southeastern United States, the U.S. Weather Bureau issued storm warnings from Vero Beach, Florida to Wilmington, North Carolina. Later, the agency issued a hurricane warning from Fernandina, Florida to Georgetown, South Carolina, prompting the threatened areas to enact storm preparations and for ships to return to harbor. Near Jacksonville, Florida, the United States Navy sent 17 planes to the Naval Air Station Olathe in Olathe, Kansas.

Before moving ashore in South Carolina, Able produced rainfall in the western portion of its circulation. Fernandina Beach, Florida reported 6.20 in (157 mm), and in neighboring Georgia, precipitation peaked at 2.10 in (53 mm) in Mount Vernon. Wind gusts in Savannah, Georgia only reached 35 mph (56 km/h).

When Able moved ashore in South Carolina, the western eyewall moved over Beaufort, where winds of up to 90 mph (140 km/h) were reported. The town received heavy damage from the storm, with houses losing their roofs and downed trees blocking roads due to the winds. For several hours, Beaufort was isolated after the winds downed power and telephone lines. The strongest winds over land were unknown since they crossed over an unpopulated swampy area. Winds in Charleston reached 63 mph (101 km/h), about 50 mi (80 km) east of where the storm made landfall. There, the hurricane caused two serious injuries and left streets flooded in ankle-deep water. Able also swept a freighter ashore near Charleston. The storm dropped heavy rainfall in the state, peaking at 6.53 in (166 mm) in Conway. The combination of the rainfall and winds left heavy damage to the cotton industry, and crop damage in the state totaled $1.5 million (1952 USD, $17.8 million 2025 USD). Other damage in the state resulted from property and communications, totaling about $700,000 (1952 USD, $8.29 million 2025 USD). The hurricane also caused two indirect deaths in the state, one from touching a downed power line, and the other from driving into a fallen tree during a period of heavy rain.

As the storm spread into North Carolina, winds of around 40 mph (64 km/h) were observed, causing light damage. Able spawned a tornado in Stokes County which damaged a few farm buildings. Rainfall in the state peaked at 6.11 in (155 mm) in Carthage. The rainfall caused low-flooding, covering a few highways and washing out a few roads. Damage in the state is estimated less than $50,000 (1952 USD).

In the Mid-Atlantic states, moderate rainfall continued along the storm's path, including 4.97 in (126 mm) at the National Arboretum in Washington, D.C. The peak rainfall in each state was 5.60 in (142 mm) in Big Meadows, Virginia, 6.09 in (155 mm) in Emmitsburg, Maryland, 4.06 in (103 mm) in two locations in West Virginia, and 2.55 in (65 mm) in Wilmington, Delaware. The rainfall caused flooding across the region, which washed out the tracks of the Baltimore and Ohio Railroad near Baltimore after a stream rose above its banks. In Ellicott City, Maryland, the rains flooded several houses, forcing families to evacuate. In addition, Able maintained stronger winds in the region, producing a gust of 60 mph (97 km/h) at Washington National Airport. The winds downed trees and power lines, which disrupted power and telephone service. The storm also spawned a damaging F1 tornado in Franconia, Virginia, which was potentially the same as another tornado in Potomac, Maryland. The former tornado destroyed one house and the roofs of two others, and also flung a car 100 ft (30 m). Damage in the area was estimated at $500,000. Further northeast, rainfall reached over 6 in (150 mm) in Pennsylvania, New Jersey, and New York, resulting in localized flooding and damage to the fruit crop. One indirect death was reported in Pennsylvania. Across New England, Able produced 1 – 3 in (25 – 75 mm) of rainfall.

== See also ==
- Other storms of the same name
- List of Category 2 Atlantic hurricanes
