= Hurricane Camille =

Category 5 Atlantic hurricane in 1969

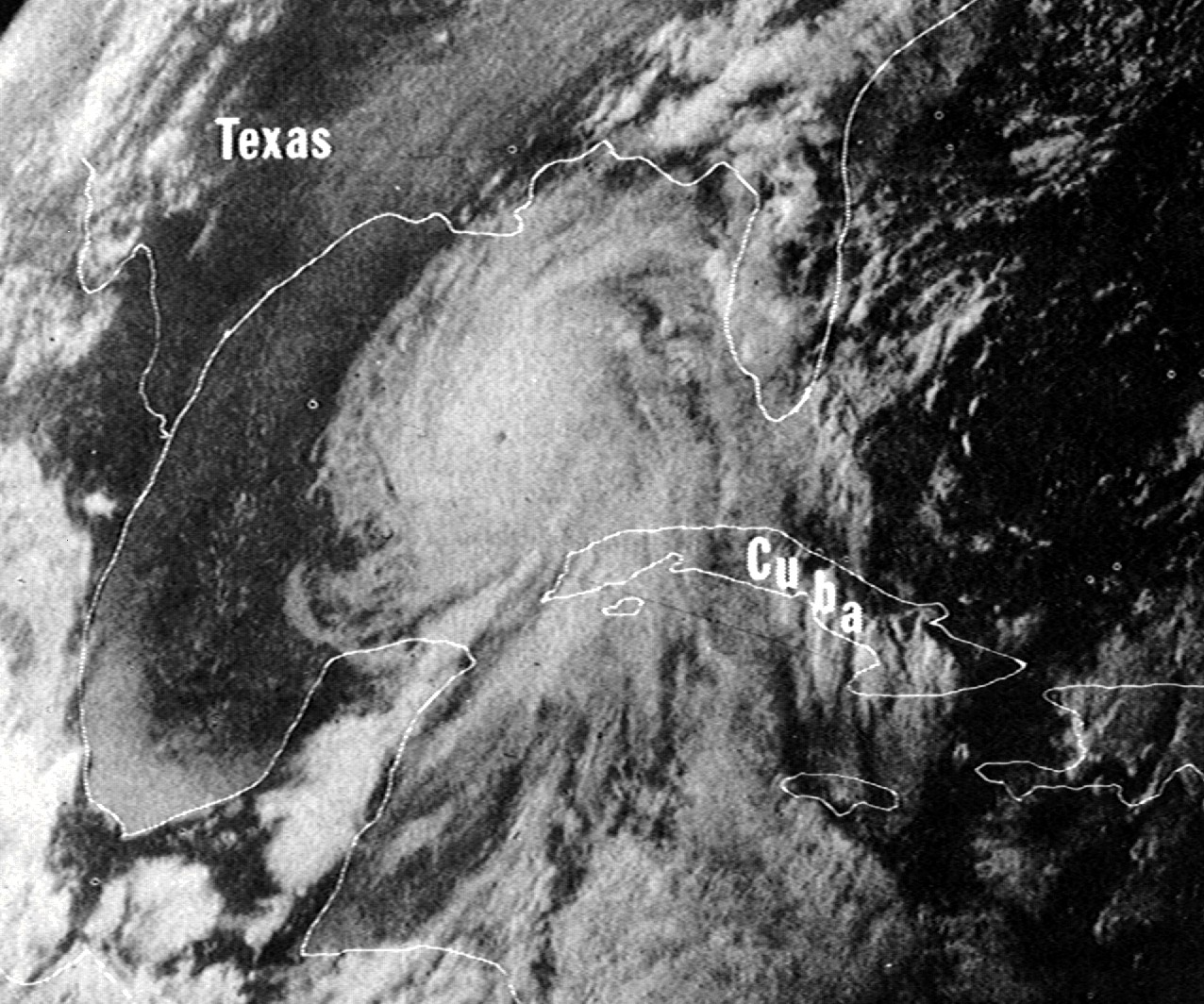
- Hurricane Camille in the Gulf of Mexico on August 16

Meteorological history
- Formed: August 14, 1969
- Dissipated: August 22, 1969

Category 5 major hurricane
- 1-minute sustained (SSHWS/NWS)
- Highest winds: 175 mph (280 km/h)
- Lowest pressure: 900 mbar (hPa); 26.58 inHg

Overall effects
- Fatalities: >348 total
- Damage: >$1.42 billion (1969 USD)
- Areas affected: Central America; Cuba; Yucatán Peninsula; Southern United States; Midwestern United States; East Coast of the United States
- IBTrACS
- Part of the 1969 Atlantic hurricane season

Hurricane Camille was one of the most powerful hurricanes to make landfall in the United States when it hit southern Mississippi in August 1969. A devastating tropical cyclone, Camille was one of four Atlantic hurricanes to strike the United States as a Category 5 on the Saffir–Simpson scale, the highest category corresponding to maximum sustained winds (Note: For Atlantic hurricanes, maximum sustained winds refer to the peak wind speed sustained for one minute at 33 ft (10 m) above the ground.) of at least 157 mph (253 km/h). The third named storm of the 1969 Atlantic hurricane season, Camille originated as a tropical depression on August 14 south of Cuba from a long-tracked tropical wave. Amid favorable conditions for development, Camille strengthened and struck western Cuba the next day as a hurricane. Upon entering the Gulf of Mexico on August 16, Camille strengthened further, first into a major hurricane, (Note: A major hurricane is a storm that ranks as Category 3 or higher on the Saffir–Simpson hurricane scale.) and then into a Category 5 hurricane, late on August 16. After briefly weakening, the hurricane intensified as it approached the northern gulf coastline. Early on August 18 as it moved ashore near Bay St. Louis, Mississippi, Camille attained maximum sustained winds of 175 miles per hour (280 kilometres per hour), and a minimum pressure of 900 millibars (26.58 inches of mercury). Throughout the United States, Camille killed at least 343 people. This included 55 indirect fatalities, mostly from cardiovascular failure. The hurricane also caused at least $1.42 billion in damages in the United States, making it the country's most expensive hurricane at the time, surpassing 1965's Hurricane Betsy. (Note: All currency totals are unadjusted for inflation.)

Before entering the Gulf of Mexico, Camille brought high winds and caused major river flooding to parts of Cuba, killing at least five people. After the hurricane entered the Gulf of Mexico, the United States Weather Bureau issued widespread hurricane warnings and watches from Louisiana to Florida. Off the coast, Camille's strong winds produced high waves that destroyed three oil platforms and flooded several others. In southern Mississippi where it moved ashore, the hurricane produced the largest storm surge in American history at the time, with a peak water level of 24.6 feet (7.5 m) recorded at Pass Christian; it was later surpassed by Hurricane Katrina in 2005. The storm surge and high winds caused tremendous damage, flattening nearly everything along the Mississippi coast and portions of southeast Louisiana. The winds devastated the region's agriculture, and contributed to the end of tung oil production in the United States. In Mississippi, 172 people died, while another nine died in Louisiana.

The hurricane weakened quickly as it pushed inland, falling below hurricane strength north of Jackson, Mississippi, and weakening further to a tropical depression over Tennessee. In parts of Mississippi and Tennessee, the rains helped end drought conditions. However, as Camille tracked through the Ohio Valley as a tropical depression, it generated severe thunderstorms that led to a cloudburst over parts of Virginia. The highest rainfall total was 27 inches (690 mm), recorded in a trash barrel near Massies Mill; this was the highest rainfall recorded in the state related to a tropical cyclone. The rains led to damaging floods across the Appalachian Mountains, killing over 153 people in Virginia and another two in West Virginia. After emerging into the western Atlantic Ocean, Camille restrengthened to a strong tropical storm before becoming extratropical on August 22. The name Camille was retired following the 1969 hurricane season.

== Meteorological history ==
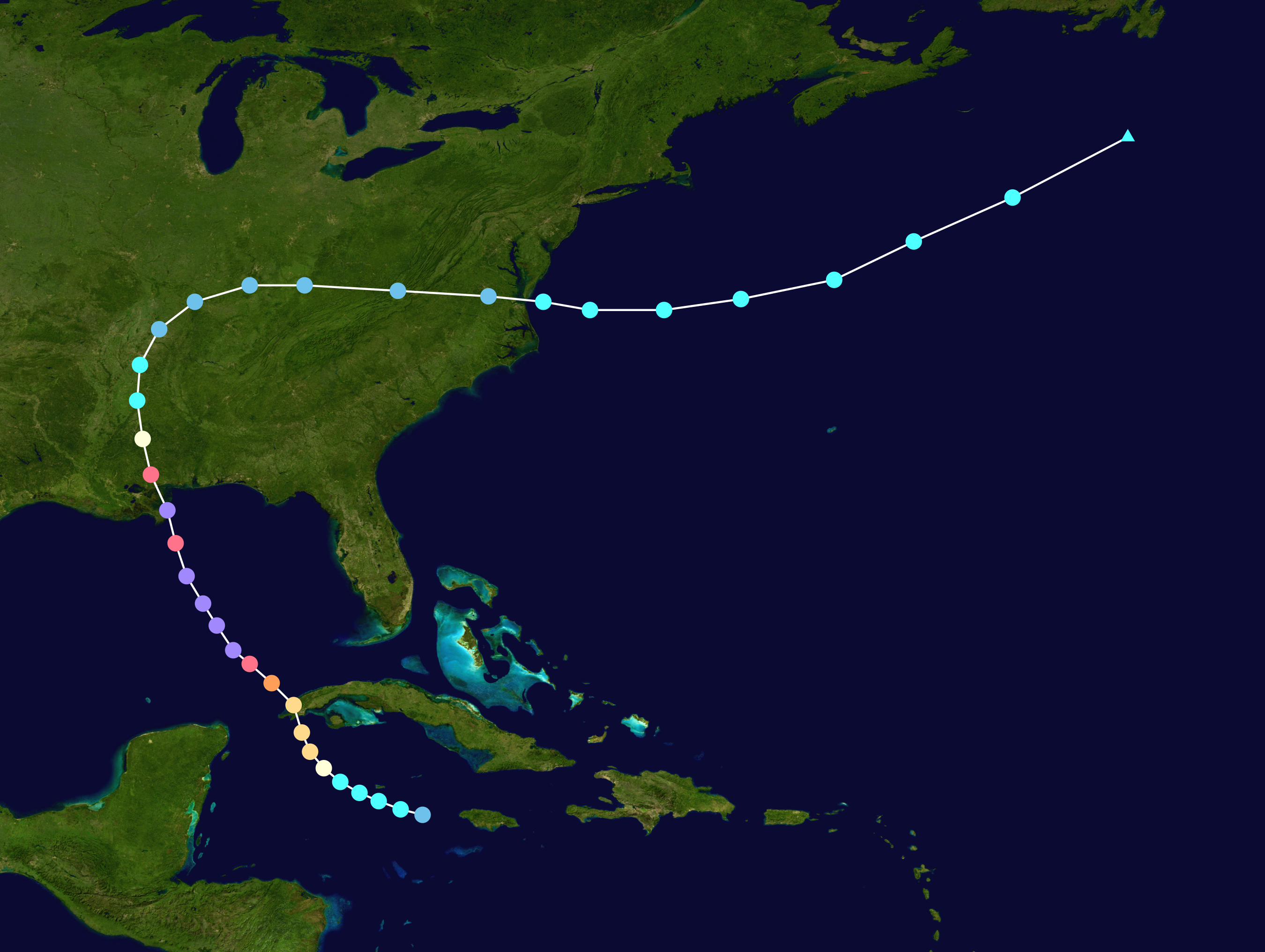
Map plotting the storm's track and intensity, according to the Saffir–Simpson scale Map key Saffir–Simpson scale Tropical depression (≤38 mph, ≤62 km/h) Tropical storm (39–73 mph, 63–118 km/h) Category 1 (74–95 mph, 119–153 km/h) Category 2 (96–110 mph, 154–177 km/h) Category 3 (111–129 mph, 178–208 km/h) Category 4 (130–156 mph, 209–251 km/h) Category 5 (≥157 mph, ≥252 km/h) Unknown Storm type Tropical cyclone Subtropical cyclone Extratropical cyclone, remnant low, tropical disturbance, or monsoon depression

Hurricane Camille's precursor was a tropical wave that emerged off the coast of West Africa near Dakar, Senegal, on August 5, 1969. The wave moved westward across the Atlantic Ocean, tracked by satellite imagery. On August 9, the associated thunderstorms concentrated into a circular area of convection while located about 500 mi (800 km) east of the Lesser Antilles. On the next day, the wave moved through the island chain and continued into the Caribbean Sea. By August 13, its convection spread from near Jamaica to the northeast through the Bahamas, although there was no evidence of a closed circulation. The thunderstorm developed banding features, and although it is unclear exactly when tropical cyclogenesis occurred, a tropical depression formed around 00:00 UTC on August 14. (Note: All times and dates are in Coordinated Universal Time unless otherwise indicated.) At the time, it was located roughly halfway between Jamaica and the Cayman Islands. The depression intensified into a tropical storm within six hours of its formation. At 17:00 on August 14, the National Hurricane Center (NHC) initiated advisories on Camille as the third named tropical storm of the season. The development was confirmed when the Hurricane Hunters observed an intensifying tropical storm on August 14 with winds of 60 mph (95 km/h), located about 50 mi (80 km) west-northwest of Grand Cayman. Upon being classified as a tropical storm, Camille was located within an area conducive to further strengthening, with light wind shear and warm, moist air coming from the south. The outflow to the north was amplified by a cold core low over the Mississippi Valley, while a narrow ridge of high pressure existed northeast of the storm. The NHC later wrote that "it was apparent almost from the outset that Camille would be an explosively deepening storm."

The newly formed tropical storm attained hurricane status by 06:00 on August 15, making it the second hurricane of the season. Camille moved northwestward toward western Cuba, described by the NHC as "small but potent", as it was tracked by radar from Havana. Late on August 15, the hurricane attained its first peak intensity, with maximum sustained winds of 110 mph (180 km/h). At 22:00 that day, Camille struck western Cuba between Cape San Antonio and Guane, and it weakened slightly over land. By early on August 16, the hurricane had emerged into the Gulf of Mexico. Initially, the NHC anticipated that Camille would turn to the north and northeast, forecasting that the hurricane would eventually move ashore on the Florida panhandle. Instead, Camille continued northwestward and resumed its rapid intensification trend after leaving Cuba. For about 18 hours, the Hurricane Hunters provided radar imagery of the center of Camille, but were unable to make direct observations of the hurricane's center, partly due to Camille's small eye. Camille's structure evolved further as strong feeder rainbands developed in each direction. The hurricane's eye contracted to a diameter of less than 10 miles (16 km), equating to a 9 mile (15 km) radius of maximum winds. Late on August 16, Camille attained peak winds of 175 mph (280 km/h), while located about 300 mi (490 km) west of Key West, Florida. This made it a Category 5 on the modern-day Saffir–Simpson scale, the highest category on the scale corresponding to maximum sustained winds of at least 157 mph (253 km/h). The intensity was based on observations from the Hurricane Hunters, which initially had difficulty measuring the intensity in the eye due to the small size. A dropsonde released during reconnaissance recorded a minimum atmospheric pressure of 908 mbar (26.8 inHg), which at the time was the lowest pressure recorded by reconnaissance aircraft. A dropsonde from another flight around 00:00 on August 17 recorded a slightly deeper central pressure of 905 millibars (26.72 inHg).

Radar loop of Hurricane Camille before making landfall in Mississippi late on August 17

As it continued toward the Gulf Coast of the United States, Camille maintained a small eye, which began to undergo an eyewall replacement cycle. Observations from the Hurricane Hunters indicated that Camille weakened, dropping to Category 4 status late on August 17. Dropsonde data from the flight indicated a central pressure of 919 millibars (27.14 inHg), before the plane was forced to end its mission early due to a damaged engine. Camille subsequently re-intensified as it neared the coast. From 02:30–03:30 on August 18, the hurricane moved across marshlands in St. Bernard Parish, Louisiana, while the center of Camille remained just offshore of the state. At 04:30 that day, (Note: 11:30 p.m. Central daylight time on August 17) Camille made landfall at Waveland, Mississippi, with peak winds of 175 mph (280 km/h). The NHC originally assessed that Camille was even stronger at landfall, with estimated sustained winds of 190 mph (305 km/h), before a reanalysis in 2014 was completed. As Camille moved ashore, an observer in Bay St. Louis measured a minimum pressure of 904 millibars (26.70 inHg) on the edge of the eye. The reanalysis concluded that Camille made landfall with a minimum central pressure of 900 millibars (26.58 inHg).

Within 14 hours of moving ashore, Camille weakened to tropical storm status, as the track shifted to the north. It curved around the western periphery of the ridge near Bermuda. At 10:00 on August 18, the NHC discontinued advisories while the center of Camille was located near Jackson, Mississippi. After moving across Mississippi, the storm weakened into a tropical depression over Tennessee on August 19, by which time Camille began a turn to the northeast. By this time, the track was influenced by a stationary cold front that extended from Nebraska to North Dakota. On August 20, the circulation accelerated eastward, moving through parts of Kentucky, West Virginia, and later Virginia. After moving through the Blue Ridge Mountains, Camille began to re-intensify despite still being over land as it encountered an area of higher moisture content. Late on August 20, it emerged into the Atlantic Ocean near Norfolk, and by 18:00 that day Camille regained tropical storm intensity. By this time, the storm began influencing the track of Hurricane Debbie over the central Atlantic, causing the latter storm to pass east of any land areas. On August 21, Camille reached a secondary peak intensity of 70 mph (110 km/h), as it accelerated to the northeast. On August 22, Camille was affected by cooler, drier air, and it weakened over the north Atlantic Ocean before transitioning into an extratropical cyclone. Later that day, the circulation became absorbed by a cold front while located south of Newfoundland.

=== Records ===
Most intense Atlantic hurricanes
Rank	Hurricane	Season	Pressure	
Rank	Hurricane	Season	hPa	inHg
1	Wilma	2005	882	26.05
2	Gilbert	1988	888	26.23
3	"Labor Day"	1935	892	26.34
3	Melissa	2025	892	26.34
5	Rita	2005	895	26.43
5	Milton	2024	895	26.43
7	Allen	1980	899	26.55
8	Camille	1969	900	26.58
9	Katrina	2005	902	26.64
10	Mitch	1998	905	26.73
10	Dean	2007	905	26.73
Source: HURDAT

Camille produced the eighth–lowest official sea level pressure ever recorded in the Atlantic basin, at 900 millibars (26.58 inHg). This was also its landfall pressure; the only hurricane to hit the United States with a lower pressure at landfall was the Labor Day Hurricane of 1935. The wind speed of Camille can only be approximated, as no meteorological equipment survived the extreme conditions at landfall, but a reanalysis in April 2014 estimated that Camille had maximum sustained winds of 175 mph (282 km/h). As of 2018, Camille was one of only four Category 5 Atlantic hurricanes to make landfall on the continental United States at that intensity. The others were the 1935 Labor Day hurricane, Hurricane Andrew of 1992, and Hurricane Michael of 2018.

When Camille moved ashore Mississippi, it produced the highest storm surge recorded in the continental United States at the time. The powerful waves destroyed most tidal gauges near the coast. Based on the debris levels in Pass Christian, Camille produced tides as high as 24.6 ft (7.5 m). The high water mark for an enclosed building was 22.6 ft (6.9 m) above mean sea level, recorded at a Veterans of Foreign Wars building in town. Camille's record storm surge was later surpassed by Hurricane Katrina in 2005, which produced a high water mark of 27.8 ft (8.5 m), also in Pass Christian.

After moving across the south-central United States, Camille dropped torrential rainfall in central Virginia. The highest observed rainfall was 27 in (690 mm), recorded in a trash barrel near Massies Mill that had been emptied before the rains began. This was the highest rainfall recorded in the state from a tropical cyclone.

=== Naming background ===
In the 1960s, there were four lists of feminine given names used for Atlantic hurricanes, with each list being used every fourth year. The practice of retiring hurricane names was meant to be temporary, with the guideline that a name be retired for ten years. When the name Carla was retired in 1961, it was replaced on the 1965 list with Carol, a name retired in 1954 when its namesake devastated New England. Since over a decade had passed, Carol was eligible for reuse. Carol entered the 1969 list, but scientists from the National Hurricane Research Laboratory (NHRL) asked the naming committee in January 1969 to permanently retire Carol, Edna, and Hazel since papers were still being written about the storms. The committee agreed but needed a replacement "C" name. Banner Miller, a member of the National Hurricane Research Laboratory, suggested Camille, named after the daughter of NHC worker John Hope. Camille had carried out a research project for school and impressed Miller. "We kept it quiet for many years," Camille said in an interview c. 2014.

== Preparations ==
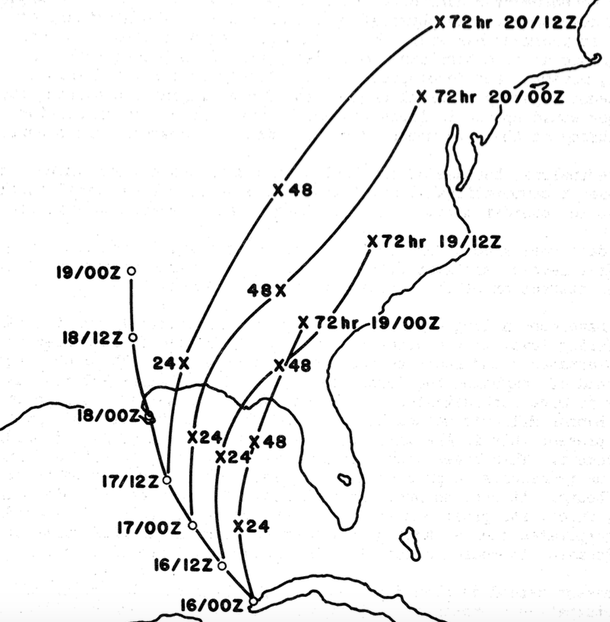
National Hurricane Center Track Forecasts for Camille from western Cuba onward. The system's actual track is marked by the line farthest to the west.

Shortly after Camille formed, the National Hurricane Center advised residents on the Isle of Pines and in western Cuba to prepare for gale-force winds, heavy rains, and rising tides. The agency also recommended small boats to remain in harbor. The threat of the storm prompted officials to evacuate thousands along the western coast of Cuba and on the Isle of Pines to higher ground. On the Isle of Pines, 10,000 cattle and 6,000 turkeys were moved to safer areas.

On August 14 upon Camille's first advisories, the Weather Bureau alerted the Army Corps Mobile District about a possible hurricane emergency in a few days. This gave days of warning to move offshore barges and other vessels to safer harbor. Power companies also began making plans upon the hurricane's formation, such as gathering electric repair workers from nearby states to be ready. Beginning on August 15, the NHC warned small boats not to sail far from the southern Florida coasts, and later that day extended the same warnings to mariners along the Florida panhandle and Alabama coast. The agency's initial forecasts anticipated that Camille would move farther east than the hurricane's eventual track. On August 16, the NHC issued a hurricane watch between Biloxi, Mississippi, to St. Marks, Florida. Part of the region was upgraded to a hurricane warning between Fort Walton Beach and St. Marks. The hurricane warning was extended westward, first to Biloxi, and later to Grand Isle, Louisiana, giving residents about 15 hours of notice before landfall. The NHC warned for the potential of coastal flooding, heavy rainfall, tornadoes, strong winds, and 15 to 20 ft (4.6 to 6.1 m) storm tides along the Mississippi coast.

Ahead of the storm, workers at Keesler Air Force Base (AFB) and the Naval Construction Battalion Center prepared by boarding up windows, securing vents, and moving outdoor furniture, before moving to the bases' shelters. All aircraft, including 17 T-28 Trojans and five C-47 Skytrains, were flown to Perrin Air Force Station in Texas to avoid the hurricane. The Weather Bureau issued evacuation warnings on August 17 between Bay St. Louis, Mississippi, and Mobile, Alabama. About 200,000 people evacuated their homes in Alabama, Mississippi, and Louisiana. The evacuees utilized hotels, the houses of friends and relatives, or the 263 shelters across the region. Among the evacuees were about 99% of residents along the Mississippi gulf coast below an elevation of 20 ft (6.1 m). Police officers and volunteers helped warn residents of the approaching storm, while television and radio stations broadcast alerts. Complications during evacuations included residents' skepticism of the predicted 190 mph (310 km/h) winds or 20 ft (6.1 m) storm tide, as well as confusion over the hurricane's anticipated landfall. Television coverage for the New Orleans media market underplayed the specifics of the impacts, while a few radio stations broadcast outdated weather reports. Several people were arrested for refusing to evacuate, while other residents stayed behind, riding out the storm in their attics. As winds picked up, the mayor of Gulfport, Mississippi, ordered all prisoners to be released from the city jail but none would leave. More than 44,000 people sheltered in Mississippi, including about 15,000 people who stayed at Keesler AFB. Nearly all of Plaquemines and St. Bernard parishes in Louisiana were evacuated by the time Camille moved ashore, with shelters segregated by race.

After Camille weakened and moved inland, local weather bureau offices continued to monitor the storm, expecting that the remnants would reach western Pennsylvania. The only nearby weather radar stations were in Richmond, Virginia, and Washington, D.C., too far away to detect the thunderstorms in western Virginia. Weather forecasters only predicted upwards of 2 in (51 mm) of rainfall for the region. Due to the lack of real-time rainfall information, forecasters were unable to issue flood warnings in mountainous regions of Virginia. Downed telephone lines prevented reports from reaching the weather bureau office, leaving most communities unaware of the flood threat. Local police and volunteers warned people about the floods and assisted in evacuations. In Covington, the city evacuated due to a water gauge recording system, set up in 1958. Similarly, Buena Vista residents were able to evacuate due to reports from the river gauges. Richmond had about 24 hours of warning before the arrival of the floods. The city was able to implement its flood disaster plan, which included closing dikes and evacuating low-lying areas.

== Impact ==
Effects of Hurricane Camille by area
Country	Deaths	Damage (USD)	Ref.
Cuba	5	$5 million	
United States	>343 (Note: There were 55 indirect fatalities related to Camille, most of them from cardiovascular failure)	$1.42 billion	
Mississippi	172	$950 million	
Louisiana	9	$322 million	
Virginia	>153	$140 million	
Offshore Gulf of Mexico	0	$100 million	
Alabama	0	$23.7 million	
West Virginia	2	$750,000	
Florida	0	$500,000	
Total	>348	$1.43 billion	
Because of differing sources, totals may not match.

Hurricane Camille produced a variety of effects from the Caribbean to the Mid-Atlantic states. The NHC stated that Camille "[ranked] as the most destructive of all hurricanes." The total U.S. estimated cost of damage was $1,420,750,000, which made Camille the country's costliest hurricane at the time, slightly surpassing 1965's Hurricane Betsy when unadjusted for inflation. Throughout the United States, Camille killed 343 people, including 288 directly, across Mississippi, Louisiana, Virginia, and West Virginia. There were many indirect deaths after the storm. A 2016 examination of death certificates in Mississippi and Virginia identified 55 indirect fatalities, most of them from cardiovascular failure. In addition, a plane crashed during takeoff at New Orleans' Lakefront Airport, killing four people, while carrying supplies to the Mississippi coast. More than 9,000 people were injured by the hurricane.

Along the United States gulf coast, Camille had a variety of damaging effects that impacted agriculture, housing, transportation, and utilities. From Alabama to Louisiana, the hurricane left an estimated 200,000 people homeless. From Louisiana to Mobile Bay, all Coast Guard buoys were moved or damaged, which disrupted navigation and cost $1.2 million to repair. The powerful waves submerged and eroded nearly all of the barrier islands offshore of Mississippi and Alabama. Pelican Island, located off Alabama's Dauphin Island, completely disappeared following the hurricane. The waves cut Mississippi's Ship Island in two by creating an inlet later known as the Camille Cut, after about 251 acres (1.02 km^{2}) of land was eroded. Nearly every pier along the gulf in Alabama and Mississippi was destroyed, and many piers in Florida were damaged. The hurricane washed out about 20 mi (32 km) of Louisville and Nashville Railroad (L&N) track from New Orleans to Pascagoula, Mississippi.

=== Caribbean and Offshore Gulf of Mexico ===
Across Cuba, five people died during Camille's passage, and damage was estimated at $5 million. The hurricane severely damaged sugar and tobacco plantations. While making its first landfall in Cuba, Camille produced winds of 92 mph (148 km/h) in the city of Guane. Rainfall reached 10 inches (250 mm) in western Cuba and nearby Isla de la Juventud. On Isla de la Juventud, the storm inflicted damage to about 100 houses. In Pinar del Río Province, Camille caused heavy damage, primarily from river flooding, resulting in a state of emergency. About 20,000 people were left homeless in the province.

In its formative stages, Camille produced light rainfall and squalls across Grand Cayman. The hurricane increased rainfall across Central America. In Costa Rica, the rains caused flooding and clogged sewer lines in the capital city San Jose. In southeastern Mexico, the hurricane dropped heavy but beneficial rainfall.

In the open Gulf of Mexico, the hurricane produced wave heights of 70 to 75 ft (21 to 23 m), as measured by Shell Oil Company. This greatly exceeded the predicted maximum wave heights of 20 ft (6.1 m) when the oil platforms were first built. Along the ocean floor, the storm created mudslides, and the combination with strong waves and winds destroyed three oil platforms, including one that at the time was the world's deepest oil well. Property damage to the offshore oil industry were initially estimated at $100 million. The strongest winds associated with Camille were recorded by an anemometer on a drilling rig off the eastern Louisiana coast; the device recorded a gust of 172 mph (277 km/h), along with 10-minute sustained winds of 130 mph (210 km/h), before it failed. Several oil platforms foundered, or filled with water, while pipelines were wrecked by the strong waves.

=== Mississippi ===
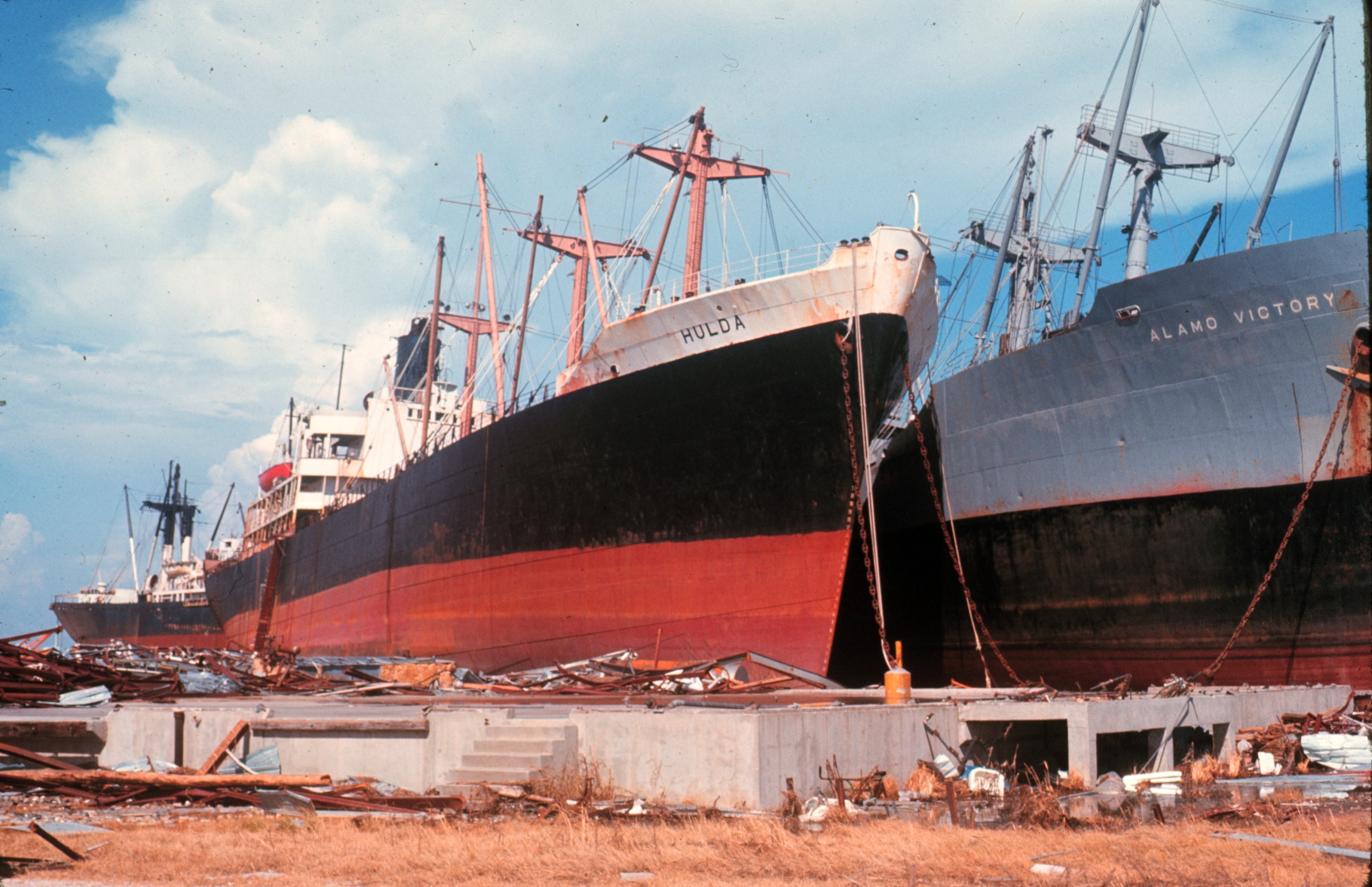
Two large ships – the Alamo Victory and the Hulda, beached in Gulfport, Mississippi

Camille made landfall in southern Mississippi as a Category 5 hurricane, producing powerful winds and a significant storm surge. The powerful waves destroyed most tidal gauges near the coast. Based on the debris levels in Pass Christian, Camille produced tides as high as 24.6 ft (7.5 m). The high water mark for an enclosed building was 22.6 ft (6.9 m), recorded at a Veterans of Foreign Wars building in town. Camille produced the highest ever storm surge in American history until it was surpassed by Hurricane Katrina in 2005. Floodwaters reached 20 mi (32 km) upstream the lower Pascagoula and Jourdan rivers. In addition to its high tides, the hurricane produced heavy rainfall as it moved ashore. A station at the NASA Mississippi Test Operations site near Picayune measured 10.06 in (256 mm) of precipitation, which was the highest rainfall total in the state. An anemometer near the site measured winds of 115 mph (185 km/h) at a height of 200 ft (61 m) for an extended period and the facility also estimated wind gusts as high as 160 mph (260 km/h). There were no direct wind observations near the landfall location; however, researchers estimated that wind gusts reached 200 mph (320 km/h). The Monthly Weather Review described the resulting impacts as "characteristic of the wind damage ordinarily associated with major tornadoes." Keesler AFB in Biloxi recorded 129 mph (208 km/h) wind gusts. About four hours after landfall, an anemometer in Columbia recorded sustained winds of 114 mph (183 km/h). (Note: The observation was converted to sustained winds from fastest mile, which was the wind speed corresponding to 1 mi (1.6 km) of air passing through an anemometer.) Farther inland, wind gusts in Jackson reached 67 mph (108 km/h). Camille also produced a tornado that touched down in Waynesboro.

In Mississippi, Camille killed 172 people, including 41 people who went missing and were never found. The hurricane also inflicted about $950 million worth of damage in the state. There were at least 116 deaths in Harrison County alone. Within the immediate landfall vicinity, the hurricane's winds and floodwaters swept away all homes and structures down to their foundations. The hurricane destroyed nearly everything along the entire coast in the state for at least three blocks inland, while the towns of Pass Christian and Long Beach were nearly destroyed. Other communities amongst the hardest hit were Clermont Harbor, Lakeshore, and Waveland, along with coastal portions of Gulfport, Mississippi City, and Biloxi. Beach front neighborhoods not facing the Gulf, such as those on the Back Bay of Biloxi, were flooded by rising water, though most buildings remained standing due to a lack of wave action. The hurricane produced widespread power outages, affecting 20 counties in the state, including some that lost power for 15 days. Downed power lines produced several small fires. Mississippi Power Company lost parts of its transmission network, and restorations were hampered by downed trees and debris. About 15% of telephone users across the state lost service during the hurricane. Statewide, the hurricane damaged 46,460 homes and trailers, including 4,287 that were destroyed. Camille also destroyed or severely damaged 2,647 farm buildings and 569 businesses in the state. In Gulfport alone, over 5,000 automobiles were damaged beyond repair. Across Mississippi's southernmost 15 counties, the hurricane damaged 1,900,000 acres (770,000 ha) of commercial forestlands to some degree. Most affected was the tung industry, as the hurricane destroyed more than 35,000 acres of tung trees, which contributed to the end of the tung oil industry in the United States. Strong winds knocked down the equivalent of about 1.2 billion board feet (2.8 million km^{2}) worth of lumber, of which more than 85% was salvageable. Many pecan orchards were also damaged. Near the coast, more than 6,000 oak trees died due to the combination of waves, winds, and salt spray. Crop damage occurred as far north as Hattiesburg.

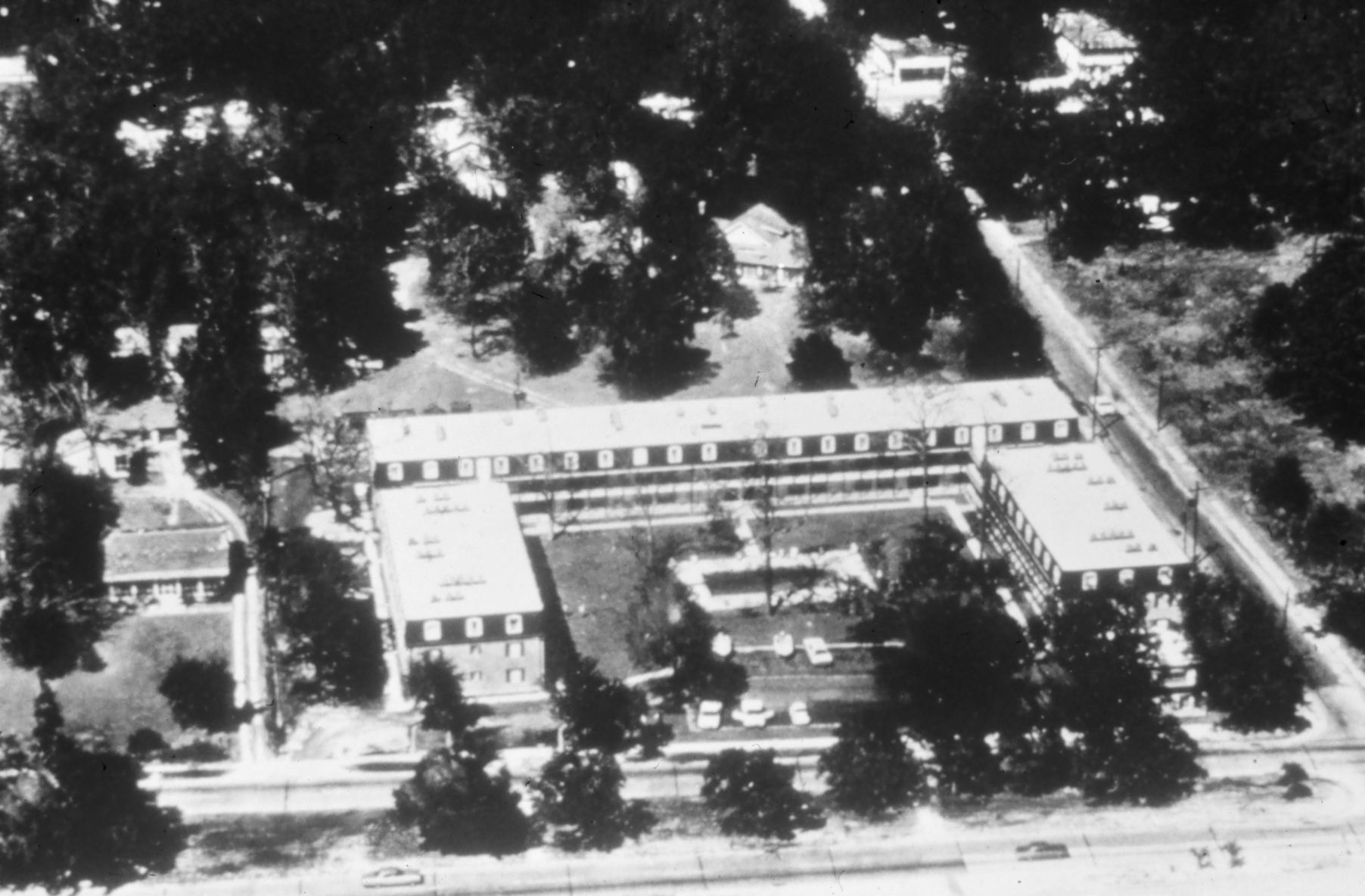

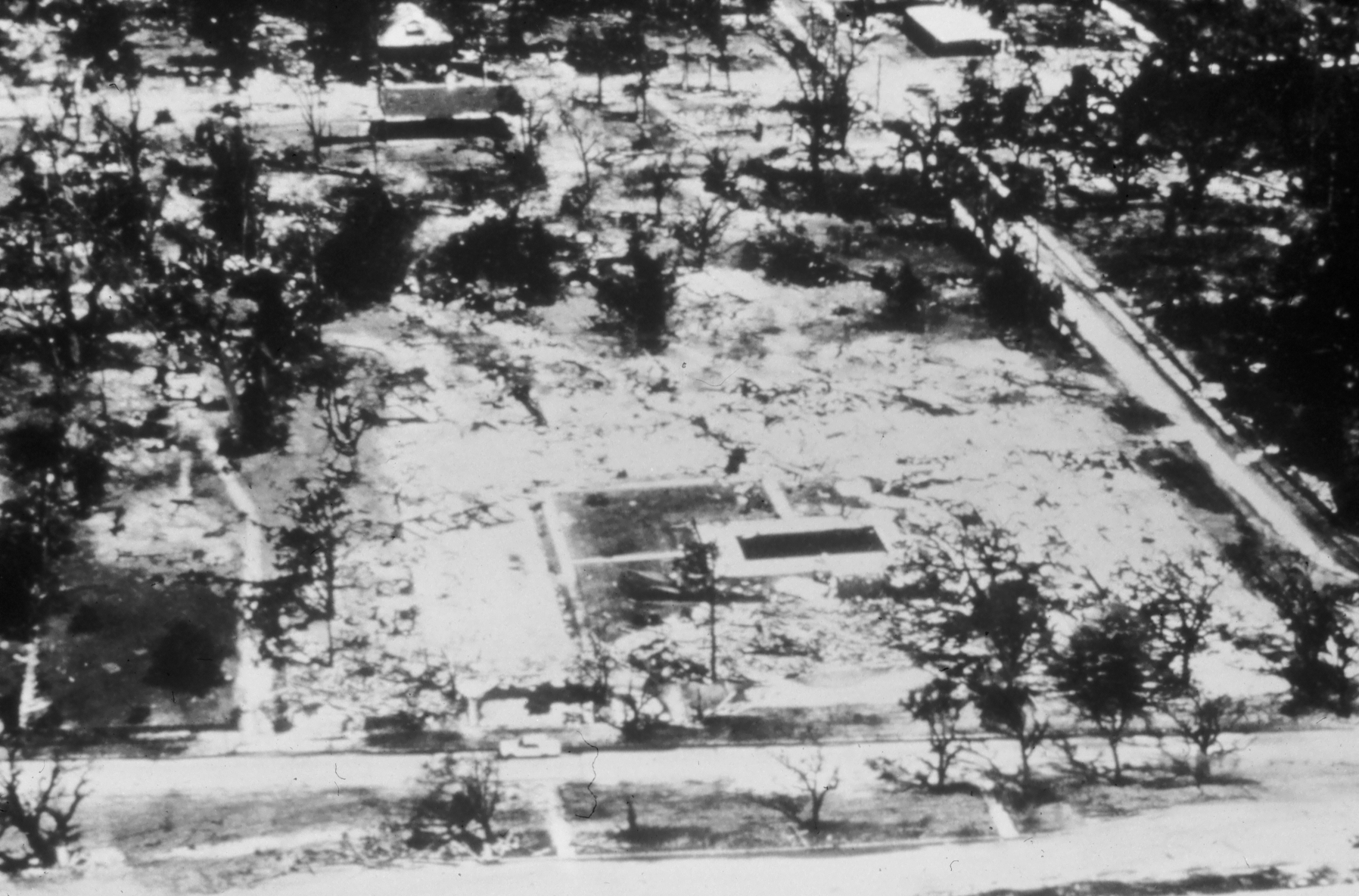
Richeliu Apartments before and after Hurricane Camille

Camille had its most significant impacts near the coast. Large portions of U.S. Highway 90 were damaged or blocked by sand and debris. At Pass Christian, the waves destroyed about 35% of the town's seawall. The Richelieu Manor Apartments were destroyed, killing eight people there; the apartments inspired an urban legend that 24 residents rode out the storm and held a hurricane party. The hurricane also destroyed the town's Trinity Episcopal church, originally built in 1849, which killed 15 of the 16 people who took shelter there. The Dixie White House, where President Woodrow Wilson and his family once stayed, was badly damaged, and subsequently torn down after the hurricane. Also in town, the hurricane destroyed a house designed by architect Frank Lloyd Wright. In Bay St. Louis, the hurricane destroyed a L&N railroad bridge. The port at Gulfport was largely destroyed, with only a portion of one wharf available for use after the hurricane. Also in Gulfport, the high waves beached a barge, leaving it on the median of U.S. 90, while also washing ashore three large cargo ships – the Alamo Victory, the Hulda, and the Silver Hawk. Of the three ships, only the Alamo Victory was refloated. The Memorial Hospital at Gulfport was damaged, forcing 729 patients to be evacuated. The Biloxi hospital was damaged, but remained operational. Keesler AFB sustained about $4.8 million in damage. Also in Biloxi, the hurricane destroyed the Episcopal Church of the Redeemer. In Long Beach, 36 buildings at the U.S. Naval Construction Center were destroyed, while hundreds of structures required new roofs, estimated at 90% of the buildings at the complex. In Pascagoula, the hurricane washed ashore the SS Mormacsun.

Though Camille weakened as it moved inland, its winds continued to cause major damage. A high school north of Waveland suffered roof and window damage and several mobile homes being used as temporary classrooms were destroyed. Every building on the campus of Pearl River Community College was damaged, one of them being totally destroyed. In Picayune, a high school was heavily damaged by a collapsed smokestack. In Poplarville, an estimated 90% of homes were damaged. Two schools in the city and a manufacturing plant were heavily damaged. A steel forestry service observation tower was uprooted by its foundation. The tung crop in the county was a near total loss. In Columbia, the storm caused extensive damage, unroofing buildings and knocking down large numbers of trees. Camille blew out storefront windows and damaged buildings in Simpson County, including the county courthouse. The storm passed over the Ross Barnett Reservoir, causing a pileup of one foot (0.3 metres) of water at the dam, leading to slight damage.

=== Louisiana ===
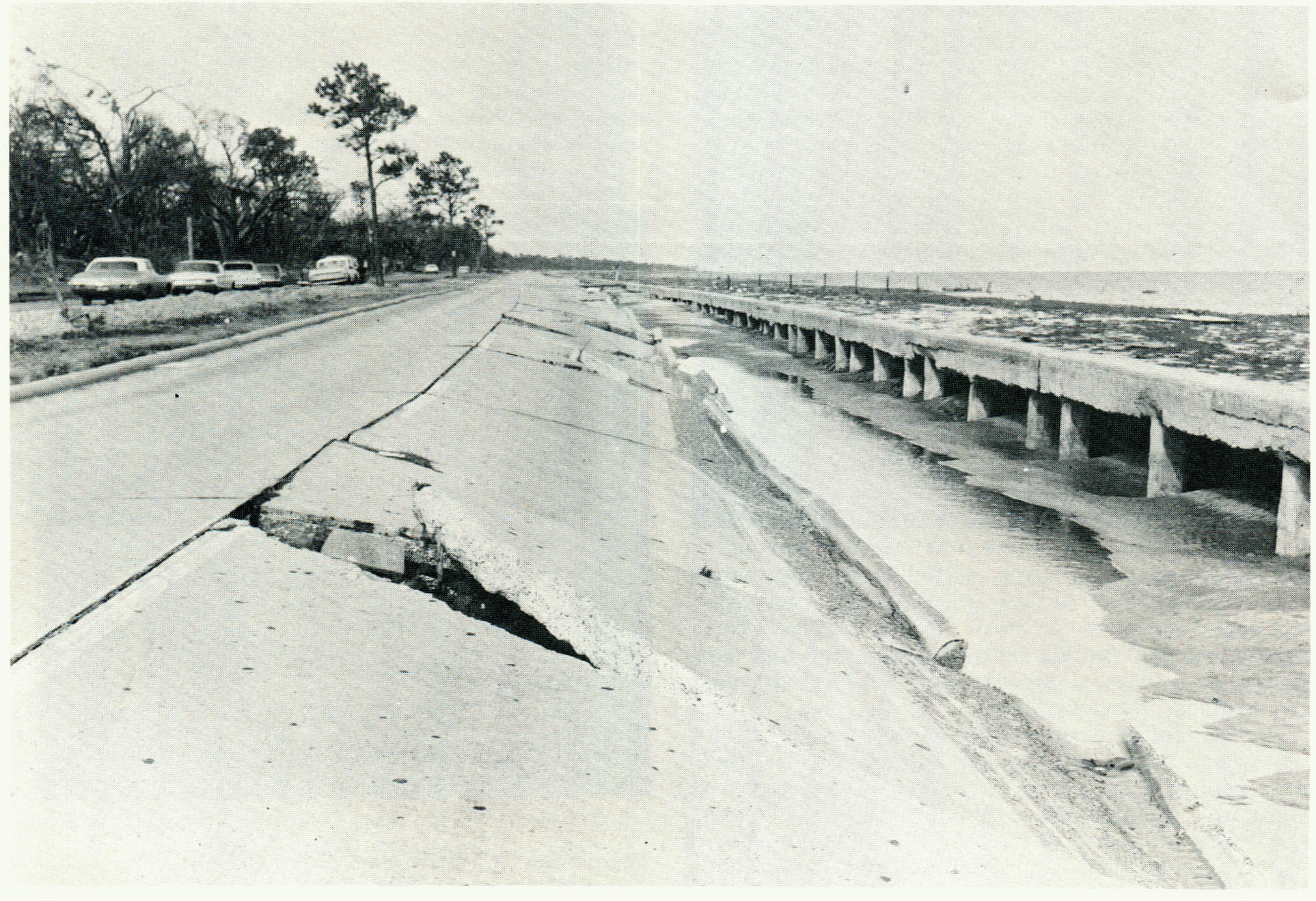
Road damage along U.S. Highway 90

While near peak intensity, Camille's eye crossed over the marshlands of eastern St. Bernard Parish. Due to the lack of dry land in the vicinity, it was not considered a landfall, although Camille still produced Category 5 hurricane-force winds in eastern Louisiana. Wind gusts were estimated as high as 160 mph (260 km/h) in Slidell. The city also recorded the state's highest rainfall from Camille, totaling 5.23 in (133 mm). Two people drowned in Slidell after driving into a flooded canal during the hurricane. Near New Orleans, Lakefront Airport recorded wind gusts of 109 mph (175 km/h). The storm turned in time to avoid a direct hit to the City of New Orleans, which was devastated just four years prior by Hurricane Betsy. Aside from eastern sections of the city, most of New Orleans only experienced tropical storm-force winds. Two levees broke in the city, forcing residents across twelve blocks to evacuate. A break in the uptown side of the Industrial Canal levee caused up to 3 ft (0.9 m) of flooding. Strong winds damaged storefronts in the downtown area and small planes at Lakefront Airport. Outside of the city, wind gusts in Boothville reached 107 mph (172 km/h) before the instrument lost power. In Boothville, floodwaters reached 17 ft (5.2 m) deep, while the Ostrica Lock near Buras recorded a storm surge of 16 ft (4.9 m). Camille's storm surge reached several hundred miles inland along the Mississippi River. The barometric pressure fell to 27.80 inches of mercury (941 hPa) at Garden Island.

Throughout Louisiana, the hurricane killed nine people, and left $322 million in damage. The combination of strong northerly winds and floodwaters nearly destroyed everything from Venice to Buras, "removing almost all traces of civilization", according to the weather bureau. Statewide, Camille damaged 8,175 homes and trailers, including 2,435 that were destroyed. The hurricane also damaged or destroyed 211 farm buildings and 110 businesses. Strong winds knocked down trees and power lines across the region. Agriculture industries experienced damage, while at least 5,000 cattle drowned. The state's citrus industry failed to produce any output in 1969, a continuation of the dearth of citrus production since Hurricane Betsy in 1965. At least 94 ships in the Mississippi River sank or washed ashore. Water washed over portions of U.S. Highway 90 to a depth of 10 ft (3.0 m). The worst storm surge flooding occurred in Plaquemines Parish and lower St. Bernard Parish. Several feet of surge also occurred along the shores of Lake Pontchartrain and around Grand Isle. In Boothville-Venice, the combination of winds and storm surge destroyed the local weather bureau office, fire station, and school. The hurricane uprooted vegetation along the Mississippi River delta; plant regrowth occurred quickly in marshes, but took longer in bodies of water.

=== Alabama and Florida ===
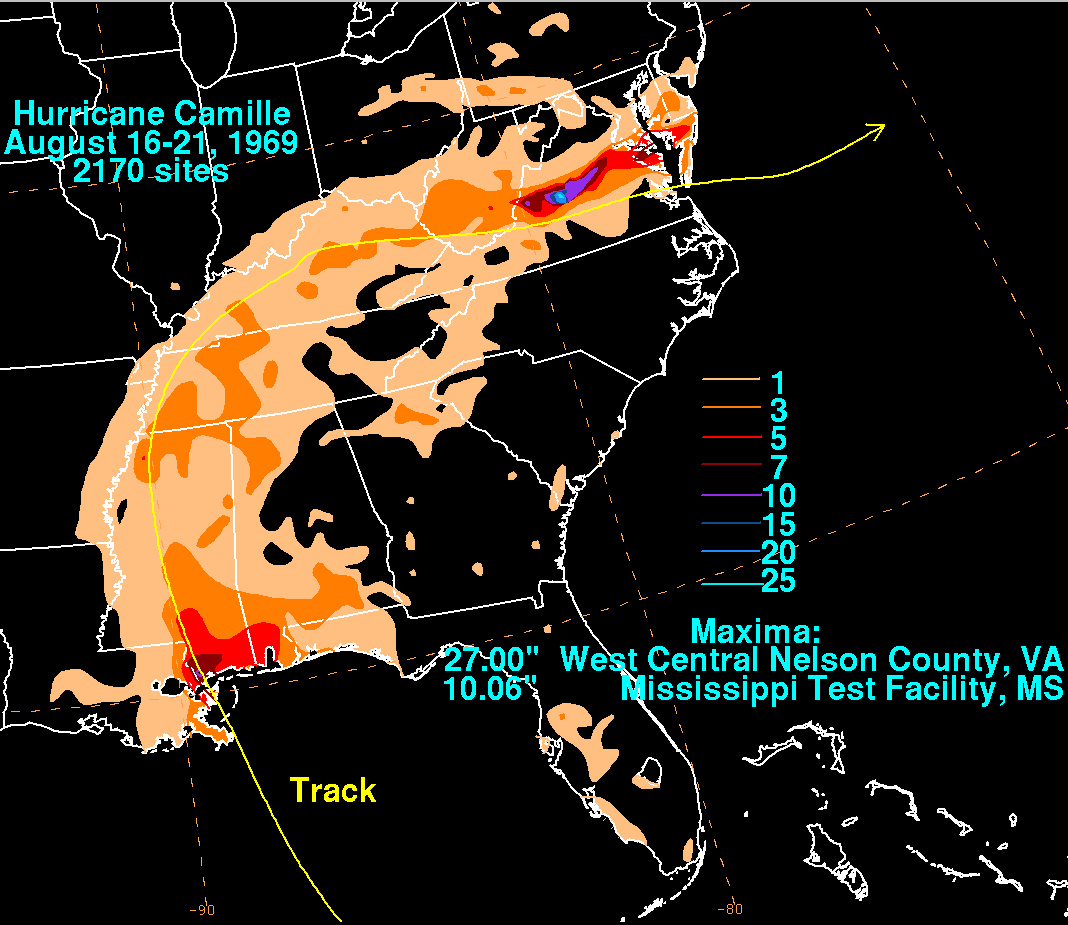
Map of rainfall associated with Hurricane Camille in the United States

The hurricane's high floodwaters extended into Alabama, reaching 30 mi (48 km) upstream the Mobile River from Mobile Bay. Storm surges in Alabama peaked at 9.2 ft (2.8 m) on Dauphin Island and 9.1 ft (2.8 m) at Gulf Shores. Across southern Alabama, the floods washed out or left sand on many roads. All offshore islands were completely inundated except for Dauphin Island, of which around 70% was covered with floodwaters. An Air Force radar on the island sustained damage during the storm. The high waters damaged parts of the causeway across Mobile Bay, while also damaging the adjacent businesses and fishing camps. Five bridges in Mobile County had minor damage. Hurricane-force winds from Camille extended into far southwestern Alabama, estimated at Category 1 intensity. Mobile recorded a peak wind gust of 74 mph (119 km/h). The highest rainfall report received within Alabama was 6.52 inches (166 mm), recorded near Fairhope. Statewide, damage reached $23.6 million. The hurricane damaged 578 houses or trailers, including 10 homes and 12 trailers that were destroyed. Camille also destroyed or severely damaged 14 businesses. Camille's high winds knocked down trees and affected agriculture industries in the state, including pecan and soybean. The hurricane also flattened about 20,000 acres (81 km^{2}) of corn fields in the state.

The large circulation of Camille resulted in tides three to five ft (1 to 2 m) above normal as far east as Apalachicola, Florida. A bridge carrying State Road 292 in Pensacola recorded a peak tide of 4.8 ft (1.5 m). Areas as far as Tampa Bay reported tides about one ft (0.3 m) above normal. Across the western Florida panhandle, Pensacola Naval Air Station measured 4.16 inches (106 mm) of rain, while a station in the city recorded wind gusts of 71 mph (114 km/h). Ahead of its landfall, Camille spawned an F0 tornado in Pensacola, which damaged a building and a car. Another F0 tornado touched down in Santa Rosa County. Camille's damage across Florida was estimated to be around $500,000. This included beach erosion and crop damage, with pecan and corn the most affected.

=== Ohio Valley and West Virginia ===
As Camille moved inland, it produced rainfall across the southeastern United States and into the Ohio Valley. Near Lake Toxaway in North Carolina, rainfall reached 4.92 in (125 mm), while the highest rainfall in Tennessee was 4.5 in (110 mm), recorded in Bolivar. The rains relieved severe drought conditions in western Tennessee, proving beneficial, although there was minor street flooding. Memphis International Airport recorded wind gusts of 32 mph (51 km/h). The winds were strong enough to knock down a tree onto a power line. West of the storm's center, rainfall reached 2.63 in (67 mm) in Eudora, Arkansas, the highest precipitation total in the state. Rainfall totals over one in (25 mm) reached southeastern Missouri and into southern Illinois, Indiana, and Ohio. Heavier rainfall occurred in central Kentucky, reaching 4.25 in (108 mm) in West Liberty.

In West Virginia, the highest recorded precipitation was 5.04 in (128 mm) in McRoss. The rains caused damaging flash flooding in Nicholas, Greenbrier, and Summers counties. The Greenbrier River crested at 17.1 ft (5.2 m), or 3.1 ft (0.94 m) above flood stage. Two people died in Renick, West Virginia, when floods trapped them in their house. In Anjean, floods washed out 30 homes. Statewide, the floods damaged 356 houses and trailers, including 48 that were destroyed. The floods also damaged or destroyed five businesses, along with 315 farm buildings. Statewide damage totaled $750,000.

=== Virginia ===
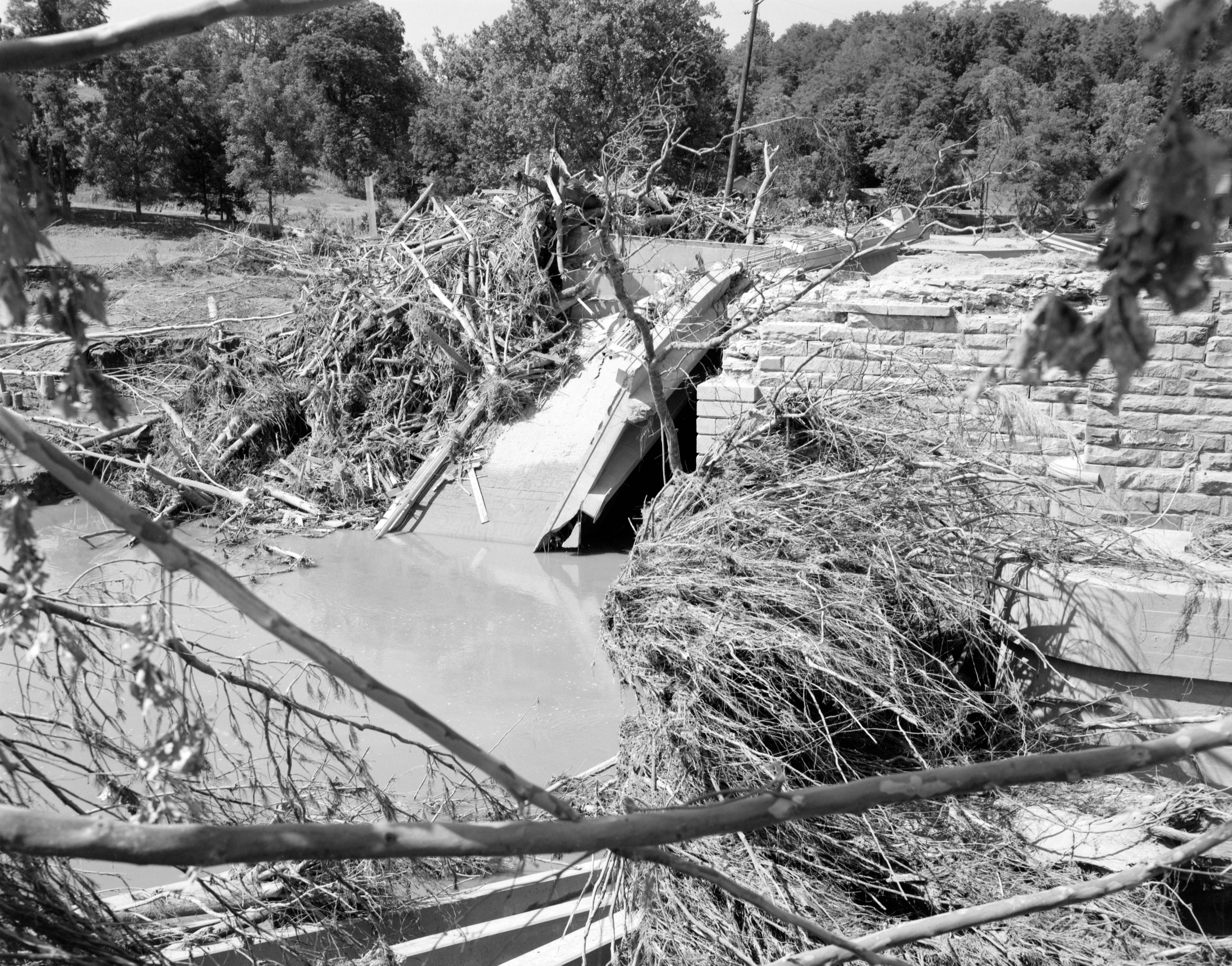
Flooding damage at Howardsville, Virginia; the bridge formerly carried Virginia Route 626 over the Rockfish River.

When Camille entered Virginia as a tropical depression, it drew moisture from the south, which concentrated as the circulation moved through the Appalachian Mountains. The thunderstorms intensified and concentrated north and east of the circulation center as they approached the western slope of the Blue Ridge Mountains. These thunderstorms developed into "catastrophic cloudburst proportions", as described by a report conducted by the United States Geological Survey (USGS). The highest rainfall total was 27 in (690 mm), recorded near Massies Mill in Nelson County. Several other locations in the county recorded more than 1 ft (300 mm) of rainfall. The Weather Bureau also received an unconfirmed report of 31 in (790 mm) of precipitation over five hours, recorded at the junction of the Tye and Piney rivers. Most of the heavy rainfall occurred over an eight hour period. Researchers estimated that the rainfall totals represented more than 80% of the maximum potential precipitation for the area. The heavy rains produced landslides as well as flash flooding along creeks and rivers. The landslides occurred on hillsides with a slope greater than 35%, with lidar scans indicating that nearly 3,800 landslides occurred in Nelson County alone. Flooding and landslides caused significant damage across Albemarle, Amherst, Fluvanna, Nelson, and Rockbridge counties. Record-breaking flooding occurred along the York River, while floodwaters along the James River were the highest in more than a century.

Camille's floods produced what the USGS described as "the worst natural disaster ever to strike Virginia." There were 153 deaths in the state, including 123 in Nelson County alone. Most of the deaths were due to blunt trauma from mudslides. There were eight fatalities that were unidentified. Statewide, the floods destroyed 313 homes along with 31 trailers, while also causing severe damage to another 415 homes and 65 trailers. An additional 1,870 homes had minor damage. The monetary costs of Camille in Virginia totaled $140 million. This included $54.635 million in damaged businesses, industries, or commercial buildings. Floods and landslides damaged or washed out 200 mi (320 km) of state highways, while damaging or destroying 133 bridges. Among the three destroyed bridges were state highways along the James River – routes 602, 603, and 690. About three mi (five km) of U.S. 29 was damaged and shut down. Damage along the state's Interstate highways was confined to gutters, guardrails, ditches, and shoulders, and a portion of I-95 was temporarily closed in Caroline County. Road damage totaled $17.48 million. Railroads in the state experienced $4.1 million in damage. Power, phone, and gas utilities collectively had over $2.5 million in damage from the storm. Agriculture and farming industries suffered $23.8 million in damage; this included 950 farm buildings that were damaged or destroyed, along with fields that were washed away, and lost livestock.

In Nelson County, the rains were so heavy that birds drowned in trees, according to newspaper reports. In the Davis Creek community in the county, the floods swept away 23 houses, leaving only two standing, resulting in at least 27 fatalities. Most of the community of Massies Mill was destroyed, sparing only two houses and a church. In Buena Vista, floodwaters reached 30 ft (9 m) deep, sweeping away vehicles and covering entire factories. Businesses and industries in the city incurred more than $26 million in damage. The Tye River in Lovingston produced a flood discharge that was eight times the maximum on the 31 year record. The Rivanna River at Palmyra rose 35 ft (11 m), while the North Anna River near Doswell rose 27 ft (8.2 m) over seven hours. Floodwaters reached nearly 14 ft (4 m) deep in parts of Glasgow, largely destroying the town's business district. In Scottsville and Waynesboro, floodwaters reached eight ft (two m) deep. Tributaries and mountain streams collected in the James River to produce record or near-record flood conditions, which nearly destroyed all of the river settlements between Lynchburg and Richmond. In the former city, the James River crested at 26 ft (7.9 m), which was the highest water level since 1877. In Richmond, the James River reached a peak of 28.64 ft (8.73 m), which equaled the record crest set in 1936 and surpassed all other floods in at least a century. In the city, the James River had a peak flow of 220,000 ft^{3} (6,200 m^{3}) per second, the second-highest on record. The floodwaters inundated low-lying parts of Richmond, including areas near the James River that flooded after a pumping station failed. Citywide damage was slightly over $9 million. At Schuyler, a hydroelectric dam on the Rockfish River was overtopped, destroying the dam's powerhouse and washing out a bridge downstream.

=== Elsewhere ===
In Maryland, Camille brought heavy rains, peaking at 6.55 in (166 mm) at Princess Anne. The rains caused localized flooding, which closed roads and washed out a few bridges. The rains damaged a junior high school in Princess Anne after floodwaters reached 15 ft (4.6 m) deep. Near Great Mills, 14 residents evacuated by helicopter due to the floods. Minor flooding occurred in Delaware. Precipitation from Camille reached as far north as Pennsylvania, with a total of 3.25 in (83 mm) recorded in Somerset. In neighboring New Jersey, Cape May recorded 1.62 in (41 mm) of rainfall.

== Aftermath ==
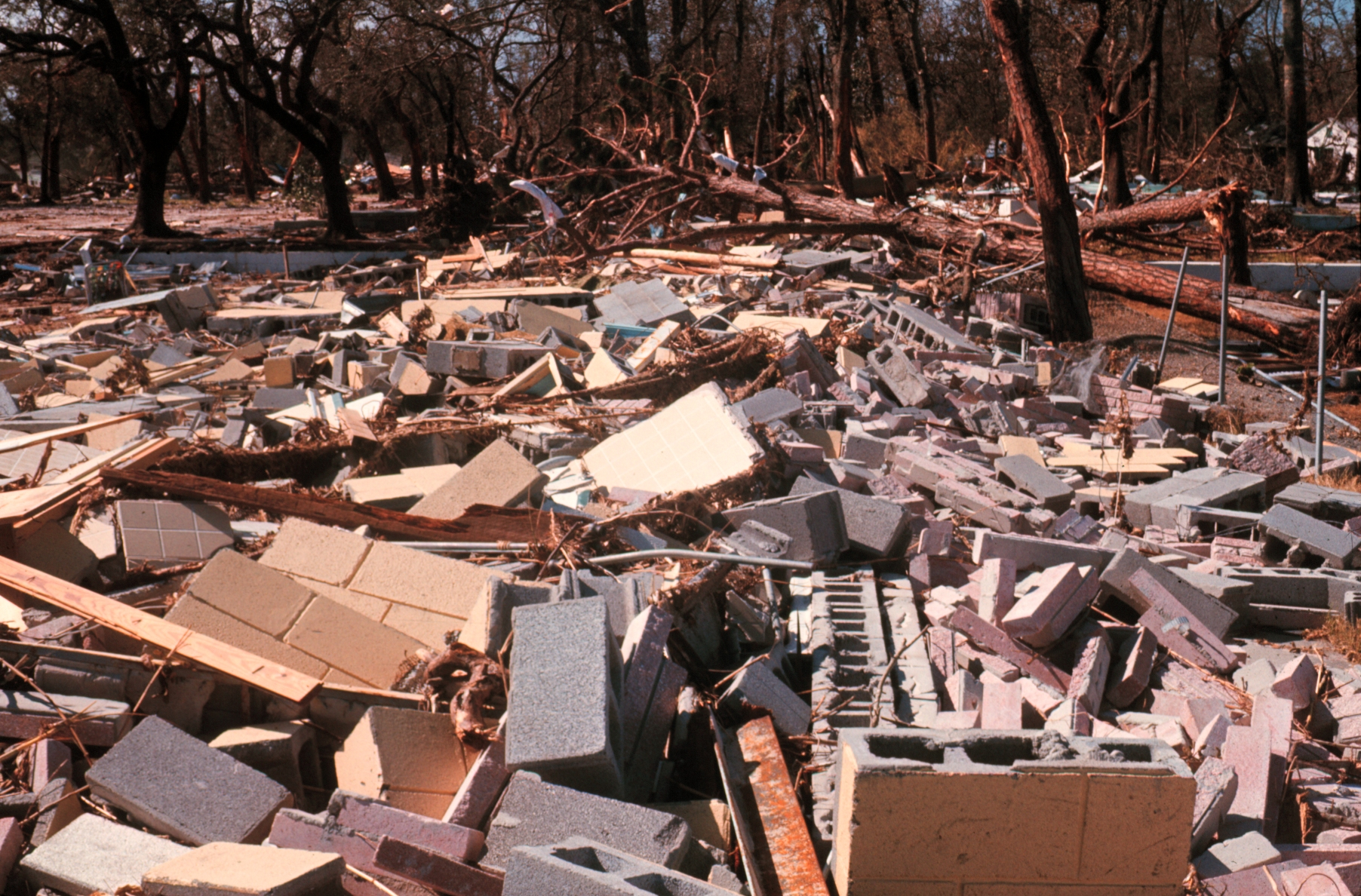
Debris from Camille

In the days after the storm struck Cuba, the government deployed medical teams to affected regions to provide typhoid vaccine shots. Officials noted the potential for the spread of disease, due to flooding from Camille as well as previously wet conditions.

Across the Gulf Coast of the United States, the response to the hurricane involved many federal, state, and local agencies and volunteer organizations. By May 1970, the federal government had spent more than $25 million toward relief efforts, including reimbursing state and local governments. Then-president Richard Nixon declared 26 Mississippi counties as disaster areas, along with 2 counties in Alabama, 4 parishes in Louisiana, and 27 counties in Virginia. Federal agencies that assisted in the relief efforts included the Economic Development Administration (EDA), the General Services Administration (GSA), the Office of Economic Opportunity (OEC), the Small Business Administration (SBA), and the departments of Health, Education, and Welfare (HEW) and Housing and Urban Development (HUD). The Department of Defense contributed $34 million and 16,500 military troops that helped in the recovery, such as clearing debris or distributing food. The United States Coast Guard surveyed coastal areas by helicopter to search for survivors. Rescues occurred as late as August 24, when a helicopter spotted a family of 12 people that was without food or water for days. The Department of Health provided $4 million towards medicine, vaccines, and other health related needs. The Federal Highway Administration helped fund repairs to roads, paying the entire cost of federal-Aid highway repair and reconstruction. By January 1970, over $13.71 million worth of highway projects had been approved. The Federal Water Pollution Control Administration assisted with sewage treatment in Mississippi and Virginia and helped clean up an oil spill in the Boothville-Venice area of Louisiana. Within three days of Camille's landfall, power was restored to Keesler AFB, although the outages and damage halted training for 15 days. After the base was cleared of debris and emergency power was restored, Keesler AFB became a hub for search and rescue operations, for aerial damage assessments, and as a point for distributing aid. Helicopters from the base flew food and medicine to storm-damaged communities until early September. After Vice President Spiro Agnew surveyed disaster areas, Nixon visited Gulfport–Biloxi Airport on September 8, speaking to a crowd of more than 35,000 attendees.

The Farmers Home Administration designated 33 counties in Mississippi as emergency areas. The Department of Agriculture's Consumer and Marketing Service provided over 4,687,000 lb (2,126,000 kg) of surplus food to victims of Camille. The Post Office Department spent over $100,000 restoring service and repairing 46 post offices affected by the storm. NASA's Marshall Space Flight Center in Huntsville, Alabama, sent a team along with a 200-bed mobile hospital to the hardest hit areas. HUD provided 5,000 temporary homes to disaster areas, while the NASA facility near Picayune, Mississippi, served as a temporary shelter for about 1,500 people. Representatives from HEW informed Mississippi schools that they would not receive federal funding unless they integrated their schools. (Note: The United States Supreme Court ruled in the 1954 case, Brown v. Board of Education, that segregated schools were unconstitutional, while allowing for gradual implementation. This was overturned in 1969 by Alexander v. Holmes County Board of Education, which required immediate implementation.) Camp Shelby opened and temporarily housed about 5,000 residents, and was likewise forced to integrate; this was despite the New York Times describing the camp as, "one of the least integrated of all of the U.S. military bases". The University of Southern Mississippi held 5,000 people displaced by Camille. Mississippi segregated buses of evacuees from Pass Christian, sending black people to Jackson State College while sending white people to the Robert E. Lee Hotel in Jackson, though the latter allowed black refugees on a separate floor.

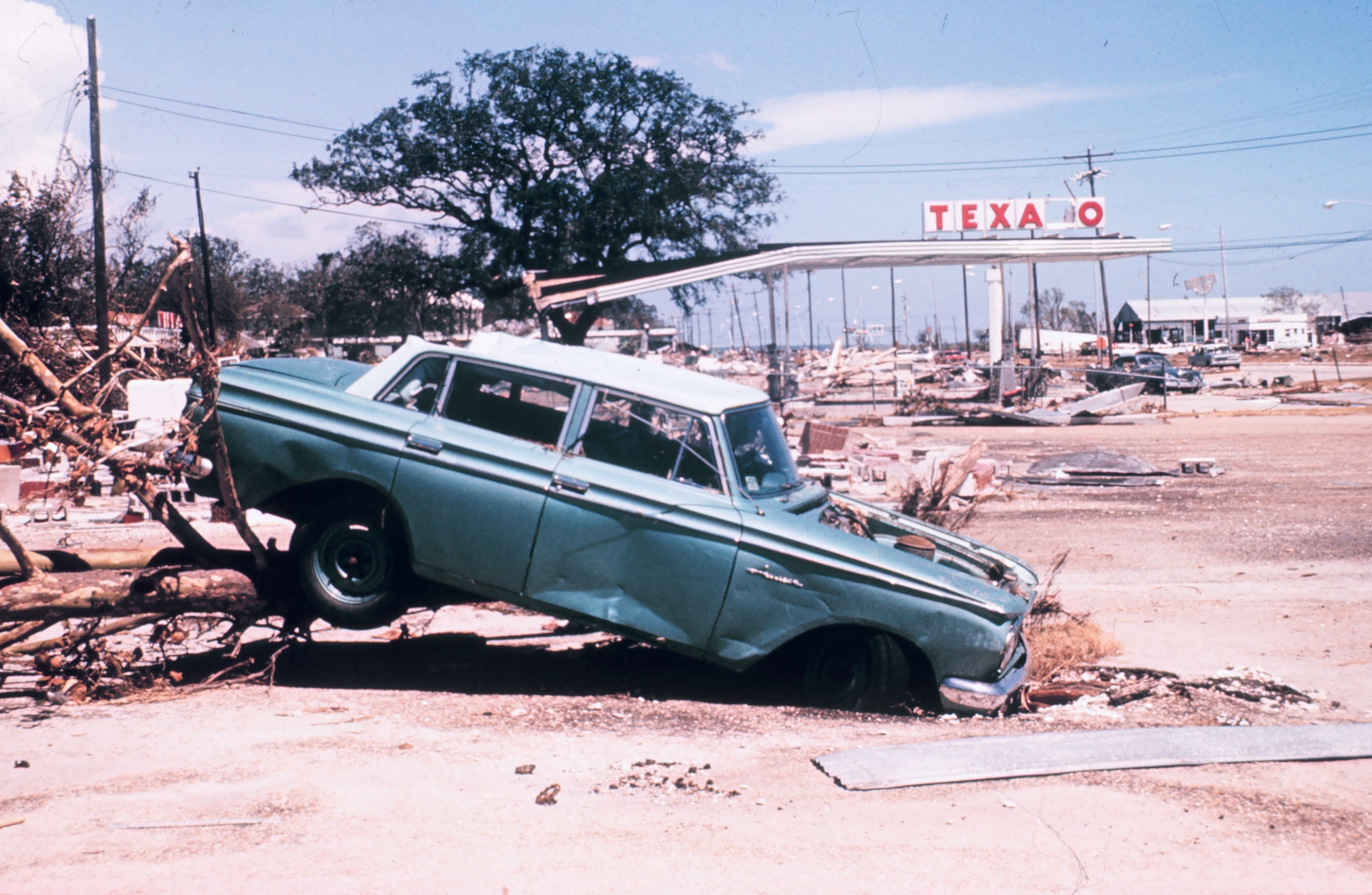
Ruins of a gas station in Biloxi, Mississippi

Mississippi Governor John Bell Williams activated more than 1,200 National Guardsmen to help protect against looting and look for survivors. The governor also activated martial law for parts of the coast, which lasted until August 27. Martial law was declared for Plaquemines Parish and the city of Bogalusa, Louisiana. Power and water companies brought workers from other states to assist in the restoration of utilities. By a week after the storm, water service was restored in Gulfport, Mississippi, followed by Biloxi a week later. Following the hurricane, Governor Williams established the Gulf Regional Planning Commission, which created stricter building codes along the Mississippi coast. Various nongovernmental agencies and volunteers helped in the aftermath of the hurricane, including the Salvation Army. The American Red Cross opened up 29 relief centers, operated 27 mobile units, and set up seven food kitchens. The Red Cross faced criticism for racial bias in aid distribution. In Jackson, Mississippi, comedian Bob Hope hosted a telethon that raised more than $1.3 million toward helping storm victims.

Across coastal areas, roads were closed for several days due to a combination of building debris and fallen trees, with 2,400 mi (3,900 km) of roads and streets affected. The Army Corps of Engineers coordinated debris removal, and within a week of the hurricane, all major roads were opened. Over a three-month period, more than 300,000 truck loads were transported to one of 17 emergency dump sights. Efforts to salvage timber in the affected region began a few days after Camille passed, producing over 100 million board-feet of pine wood. The reduced tree coverage across southern Mississippi decreased squirrel and bird populations in the area. Concurrently, the snake population increased in southeastern Mississippi, forcing residents to organize and hunt. The 43rd Engineer Battalion of the Army Corps cleared Mississippi beaches of deceased animals, removing 28 short tons (25,000 kg) worth of carcasses by August 24. The odor of decaying animals persisted for about a week after the storm. Seabees also shot stray starving dogs, while the local shelter in Harrison County helped care for cats and dogs displaced by the storm. To control the spread of mosquitos, four aircraft from Keesler AFB sprayed malathion at a low altitude between Pascagoula and Waveland, Mississippi. The storm had long-lasting effects on agricultural products in the region. The tung industry, already reeling from freezes in previous years and unfavorable economic conditions, never recovered from losses inflicted by the storm and tung was largely replaced by other crops. Pecan production in Mississippi saw a significant decline following the storm, with the 1970 crop yielding 27% of the previous 5-year average. Following Camille's passage in Virginia, an orchard in Lovingston produced a new variety of apple that became known as the Ginger Gold.

Total insurance payments following the storm were estimated at $225 million. Most insurance policies in the affected areas did not cover damage due to flooding or waves, and ultimately, only 20% of flood damage was covered by insurance. The lack of flood insurance became a major obstacle to redevelopment, especially in low-lying areas of Harrison County. The hurricane affected local economies. Economic activity in Harrison County spiked following the storm, with a significant increase in sales of lumber and building materials. Most of the new housing construction was in rural areas of the county outside of Biloxi and Gulfport. Unemployment in the county spiked to 12% the month after the storm and did not return to pre-Camille levels until August 1970.

Long-term redevelopment was overseen by the Department of Commerce, which contributed $30 million towards planned and coordinated redevelopment of affected areas. NOAA Weather Radio was expanded to coastal locations during the 1970s, based upon recommendations made by the Department of Commerce in September 1969. The lack of adequate aircraft observation during Camille's rapid intensification led to the Super Constellation planes being retired on August 25, 1969, to be replaced with Lockheed WC-130. The devastation of Camille, following a series of other damaging hurricanes, led engineer Herbert Saffir and then-NHC director Robert Simpson to develop the Saffir–Simpson scale. In 1973, the hurricane hunters and their associated reconnaissance aircraft relocated to Keesler AFB, following the closure of their previous headquarters in Ramey, Puerto Rico. Concerns about the adequacy of aerial weather reconnaissance after Camille led to the U.S. Air Force and NOAA taking steps to modernize their reconnaissance aircraft. Prior to Camille, only two communities had been made eligible for the National Flood Insurance Program. In December 1969, the National Flood Insurance Act of 1968 was amended with an emergency program to extend federally subsidized flood insurance to communities that had not undergone rate making studies. Partly due to Camille's aftermath and the need for more federal coordination, the United States Congress passed the Disaster Relief Act of 1969. This was followed by the Disaster Relief Act of 1970, which removed the American Red Cross as the lead volunteer organization, a position it held since 1905. Congress later passed the Disaster Relief Act of 1974, which required training for state and local emergency management agencies. In 1979, President Jimmy Carter issued an executive order establishing the Federal Emergency Management Agency (FEMA), consolidating federal disaster agencies.

In 2004, the city of Biloxi opened the Hurricane Camille Memorial, which was damaged a year later by Hurricane Katrina. In 2009, federal agencies including the National Park Service and the United States Geological Survey developed the Mississippi Coastal Improvements Program. Part of the project included filling the Camille Cut in Ship Island, which began in 2017. The project finished in 2019, reconnecting the east and west side of the island and restoring vegetation at the former inlet. It was the second-largest project in the history of the National Park Service.

Due to the high death toll and major destruction the hurricane caused in much of the Southern United States, the name Camille was retired after the 1969 season, and will never again be used for an Atlantic basin tropical cyclone. The name Cindy was selected to replace Camille in 1973. However, the 4‑year lists were replaced in 1971 by a new series of lists running though 1980. In 2024, researchers estimated that Camille would cause $59 billion in damage if it struck in 2022, based on population and wealth changes.

== See also ==
- List of Mississippi hurricanes
- List of Virginia hurricanes
- List of Atlantic hurricane records
