= SS Skagway Victory =

American World War II cargo ship

- Typical Victory Ship.

History

United States
- Name: SS Skagway Victory
- Namesake: Skagway, Alaska
- Owner: War Shipping Administration
- Operator: States Marine Lines Inc.
- Builder: Oregon Shipbuilding Company Portland
- Yard number: 1032
- Laid down: May 12, 1944
- Launched: June 21, 1944
- Completed: July 15, 1944
- Homeport: Portland, Oregon
- Identification: IMO number: 5078909; Call sign: WSBG
- Fate: Sold within the United States, 1949

United States
- Name: SS Constitution State
- Owner: States Marine Lines, Inc.
- Renamed: Constitution State, 1949
- Homeport: New York City
- Fate: Sold within the United States, 1969

United States
- Name: SS Silver Hawk
- Owner: Oneida Steamship Company Inc.
- Renamed: Silver Hawk, 1969
- Homeport: New York City
- Fate: Wrecked in Gulfport, 1969; Scrapped in situ 1970

General characteristics
- Class & type: VC2-S-AP3 Victory ship
- Tonnage: 7,612 GRT; 4,553 NRT
- Displacement: 15,200 tons
- Length: 455 ft (139 m)
- Beam: 62 ft (19 m)
- Draft: 28 ft (8.5 m)
- Installed power: 8,500 shp (6,300 kW)
- Propulsion: HP & LP turbines geared to a single 20.5-foot (6.2 m) propeller
- Speed: 16.5 knots (30.6 km/h; 19.0 mph)
- Boats & landing craft carried: 4 lifeboats
- Complement: 62 Merchant Marine and 28 US Naval Armed Guards
- Armament: As World War II ship only; 1 × 5-inch (127 mm)/38 caliber gun; 1 × 3-inch (76 mm)/50 caliber gun; 8 × 20 mm Oerlikon (as Victory ship)

SS Skagway Victory was a Victory ship built for the United States during World War II. She was launched by the Oregon Shipbuilding Corporation on June 21, 1944, and was completed on July 15, 1944. The ship's US Maritime Commission designation was VC2-S-AP3, hull number 116 (V-116). She was built in 64 days under the Emergency Shipbuilding program. The Maritime Commission turned her over to a civilian contractor, the Alcoa, for operation until the end of World War II hostilities. She was operated under the US Merchant Marine Act for the War Shipping Administration.

Victory ships were designed to replace the earlier Liberty ships. Liberty ships were designed to be used solely for World War II, while Victory ships were designed to last longer and serve the US Navy after the war. The Victory ship differed from a Liberty ship in that they were faster, longer, wider, and taller, had a thinner stack set farther toward the superstructure and had a long raised forecastle.

SS Skagway Victory serviced in the Pacific Theater of Operations during the last months of World War II in the Pacific War. Skagway Victory took supplies to support the Battle of Okinawa.

== World War II ==
SS Skagway Victory used her deck guns to fire at enemy planes from June 7 to 28, 1945, to defend both herself and other ships at Okinawa. Skagway Victory took supplies to support the troops at the Battle of Okinawa.

== Post War ==
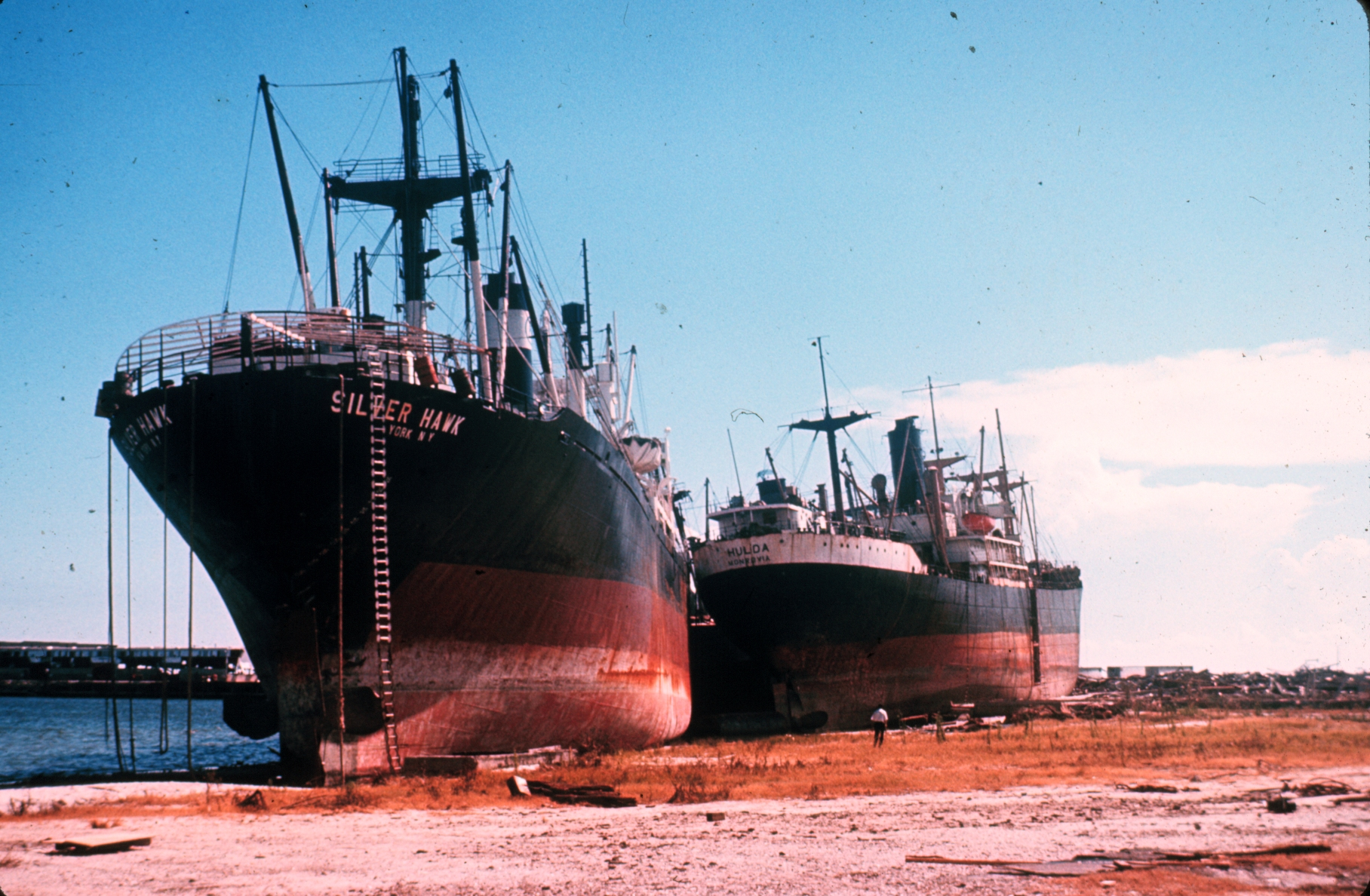
SS Silver Hawk after Hurricane Camille in 1969

In 1949 Skagway Victory was sold to States Marine Lines Inc. of Wilmington, Delaware and renamed SS Constitution State. Her new port of registry was New York City. In 1969 she was sold to Oneida Steamship Company Inc. of New York City and renamed SS Silver Hawk.

On August 18, 1969, she was driven around and shipwrecked due to Hurricane Camille at Gulfport, Mississippi. She was not worth repairing due to her age.

In 1970 she was scrapped in Gulfport.

== Sources ==
- Sawyer, L.A. and W.H. Mitchell. Victory ships and tankers: The history of the 'Victory' type cargo ships and of the tankers built in the United States of America during World War II, Cornell Maritime Press, 1974, 0-87033-182-5.
- United States Maritime Commission: Victory Ships alphabetical list War II
- Victory Cargo Ships Oregon Shipyards Record Breakers Page 2
- Appleman, Roy E. (1998), South to the Naktong, North to the Yalu: United States Army in the Korean War, Washington, D.C.: Department of the Army, ISBN 978-0-16-001918-0, archived from the original on 2014-02-07 p. 259
