= Ben Hawkins =

Ben Hawkins may refer to:

- Benjamin Hawkins (1754–1818), U.S. statesman
  - SS Benjamin Hawkins
- Benjamin Waterhouse Hawkins (1807–1894), English sculptor and natural history artist
- Ben Hawkins (Carnivàle), the protagonist in Carnivàle
- Ben Hawkins (American football) (1944–2017), American football player
