= SS Badger State =

SS Badger State may refer to:

- SS Badger State (1919), a possible name assigned to the transport SS American Legion (1919) before she was launched
- SS Badger State (1943), a cargo ship launched in 1943 and sunk in 1970, and that served in the United States Navy as the transport USS Starlight (AP-175) from 1944 to 1945
