= SS Hugh J. Kilpatrick =

Liberty ship of WWII

History

United States
- Name: Hugh J. Kilpatrick
- Namesake: Hugh J. Kilpatrick
- Owner: War Shipping Administration (WSA)
- Operator: States Marine Corp.
- Ordered: as type (EC2-S-C1) hull, MC hull 2480
- Awarded: 23 April 1943
- Builder: St. Johns River Shipbuilding Company, Jacksonville, Florida
- Cost: $1,161,069
- Yard number: 44
- Way number: 2
- Laid down: 21 April 1944
- Launched: 31 May 1944
- Sponsored by: Laura Consuelo Landa
- Completed: 22 June 1944
- Identification: Call sign: WQFD
- Fate: Sold for commercial use, 21 October 1946

United States
- Name: Hoosier State
- Namesake: State of Indiana
- Owner: States Marine Corp
- Fate: Sold, April 1955

United States
- Name: Transamerican
- Owner: American Union Transport, Inc.
- Operator: Transamerican Steamship Corp.
- Fate: Sold, 19 August 1963

United States
- Name: A & J Mid-America
- Owner: Mid-America Steamship Corp.
- Operator: Pacific Seafarers, Inc.
- Fate: Grounded during typhoon, 9 May 1964, sold, 2 April 1965

Liberia
- Name: Grand Hope
- Owner: Hope Navigation Corp.
- Operator: Sea King Corp
- Fate: Sold, 1967

South Korea
- Name: Union Tiger
- Owner: Union Shipping Co. (1967-1968); Hapdong Shipping Co. (1968-1969)
- Operator: Livanos, Ltd.
- Fate: Scrapped, 1969

General characteristics
- Class & type: Liberty ship; type EC2-S-C1, standard
- Tonnage: 10,865 LT DWT; 7,176 GRT
- Displacement: 3,380 long tons (3,434 t) (light); 14,245 long tons (14,474 t) (max)
- Length: 441 feet 6 inches (135 m) oa; 416 feet (127 m) pp; 427 feet (130 m) lwl
- Beam: 57 feet (17 m)
- Draft: 27 ft 9.25 in (8.4646 m)
- Installed power: 2 × Oil fired 450 °F (232 °C) boilers, operating at 220 psi (1,500 kPa); 2,500 hp (1,900 kW)
- Propulsion: 1 × triple-expansion steam engine, (manufactured by Joshua Hendy Iron Works, Sunnyvale, California); 1 × screw propeller
- Speed: 11.5 knots (21.3 km/h; 13.2 mph)
- Capacity: 562,608 cubic feet (15,931 m^{3}) (grain); 499,573 cubic feet (14,146 m^{3}) (bale)
- Complement: 38–62 USMM; 21–40 USNAG
- Armament: Varied by ship; Bow-mounted 3-inch (76 mm)/50-caliber gun; Stern-mounted 4-inch (102 mm)/50-caliber gun; 2–8 × single 20-millimeter (0.79 in) Oerlikon anti-aircraft (AA) cannons and/or, 2–8 × 37-millimeter (1.46 in) M1 AA guns

SS Hugh J. Kilpatrick was a Liberty ship built in the United States during World War II. She was named after Hugh J. Kilpatrick, an officer in the Union Army during the American Civil War, achieving the rank of brevet major general. He was later the United States Minister to Chile.

== Construction ==
Hugh J. Kilpatrick was laid down on 21 April 1944, under a Maritime Commission (MARCOM) contract, MC hull 2480, by the St. Johns River Shipbuilding Company, Jacksonville, Florida; she was sponsored by Laura Consuelo Landa, granddaughter of the namesake, and was launched on 31 May 1944.

== History ==
She was allocated to the States Marine Corp., on 22 June 1944. She was sold for commercial use, 21 October 1946, to American Union Transport, Inc., for $558,118.52 and renamed Hoosier State. After several name and owner changes she was scrapped in South Korea, in 1969.

== Bibliography ==
- "St. John's River Shipbuilding, Jacksonville FL". www.ShipbuildingHistory.com. 16 October 2010.
- Maritime Administration. "Hugh J. Kilpatrick". Ship History Database Vessel Status Card. U.S. Department of Transportation, Maritime Administration.
- Davies, James (May 2004). "Specifications (As-Built)" (PDF). p. 23.
- "SS Hugh J. Kilpatrick".
