= SS Alamo Victory =

World War II Victory ship of the United States

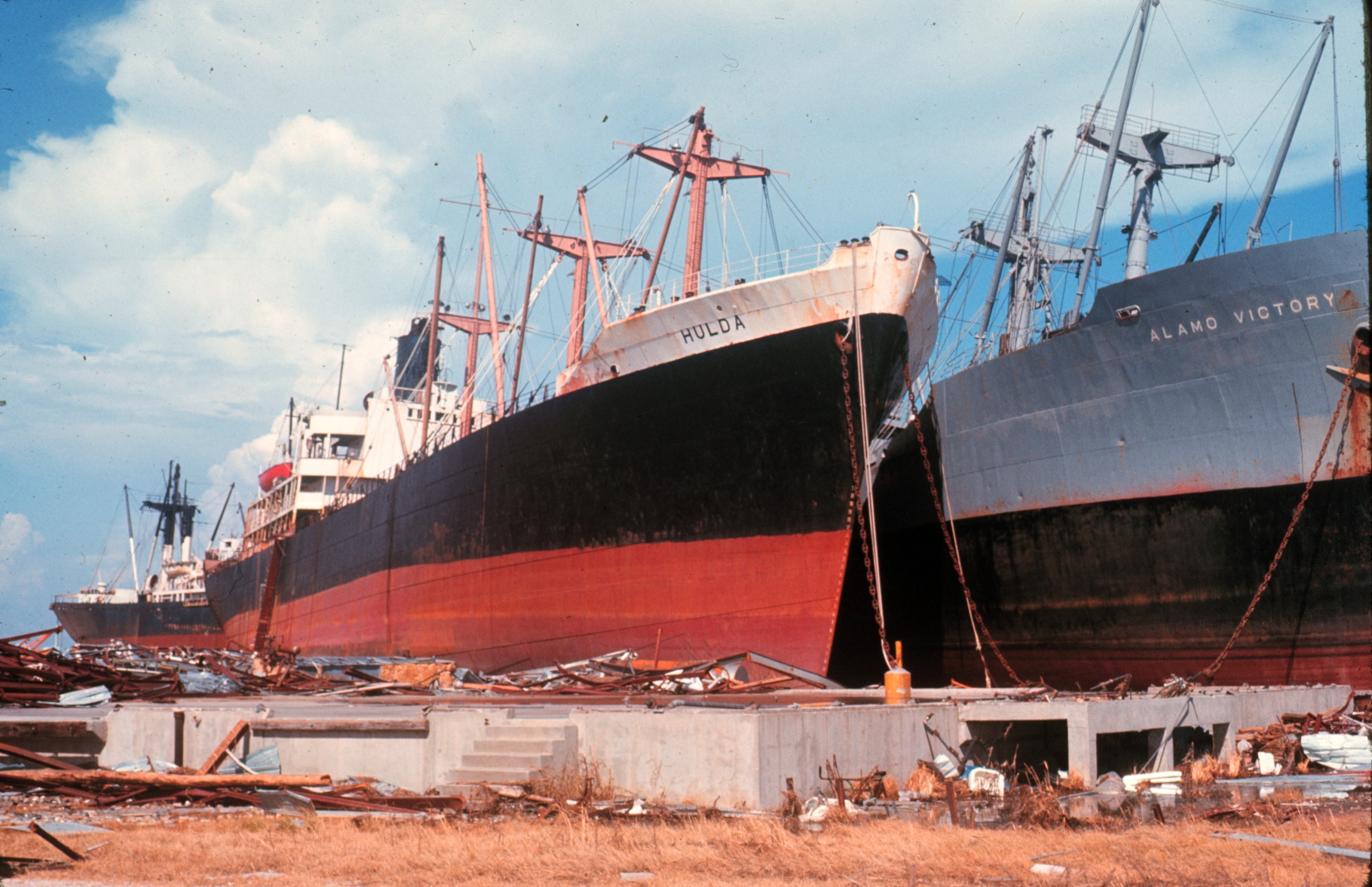
- General cargo ships Alamo Victory and Hulda after Hurricane Camille, August 1969

History

United States
- Name: Alamo Victory
- Owner: War Shipping Administration
- Operator: Isthmian Steamship Company
- Builder: California Shipbuilding Company, Los Angeles
- Yard number: V32
- Laid down: May 25, 1944
- Launched: July 13, 1944
- Completed: August 18, 1944
- Home port: Los Angeles
- Identification: IMO number: 5007869; Call sign: KSUO
- Fate: Wrecked in Hurricane Camille 1969, scrapped 1971 in New Orleans

General characteristics
- Class & type: VC2-S-AP3 Victory ship
- Tonnage: 7,612 GRT, 4,553 NRT
- Displacement: 15,200 tons
- Length: 455 ft (139 m)
- Beam: 62 ft (19 m)
- Draught: 28 ft (8.5 m)
- Installed power: 8,500 shp (6,300 kW)
- Propulsion: HP & LP turbines geared to a single 20.5-foot (6.2 m) propeller, by Westinghouse Electric & Mfg. Co., Essington
- Speed: 16.5 knots (30.6 km/h; 19.0 mph)
- Boats & landing craft carried: 4 lifeboats
- Complement: 62 Merchant Marine and 28 US Naval Armed Guards
- Armament: 1 × 5-inch (127 mm)/38 caliber gun as Victory ship; 1 × 3-inch (76 mm)/50 caliber gun; 8 × 20 mm Oerlikon

SS Alamo Victory was the 42nd Victory ship built during World War II under the Emergency Shipbuilding program. She was launched by the California Shipbuilding Company on July 13, 1944, and completed on August 18, 1944. The ship’s United States Maritime Commission designation was VC2- S- AP3, hull number 42 (V-32), she worked as merchant marine for all of her career. SS Alamo Victory served in the Pacific Ocean during World War II and was operated by the Isthmian Steamship Company. The 10,500-ton Victory ships were designed to replace the earlier Liberty ships. Liberty ships were designed to be used just for World War II. Victory ships were designed to last longer and serve the US Navy after the war. The Victory ship differed from a Liberty ship in that they were: faster, longer and wider, taller, had a thinner stack set farther toward the superstructure, and had a long raised forecastle.

== World War II ==
SS Alamo Victory steamed into the Pacific to bring supplies to the Pacific War troops. After World War II the war victory the Alamo Victory took supplies to Japan. Her home port was San Francisco, California. In 1949 the SS Alamo Victory was laid up in the National Defense Reserve Fleet at Suisun Bay. In 1950 she was reactivated to take supplies to Korea.

== Korean War ==
SS Alamo Victory served as Merchant Marine Naval ship supplying goods for the Korean War and operated by the States Marine Lines. She made trips to and from Korea. About 75 percent of the personnel taken to Korea for the Korean War came by the Merchant Marine Ships. SS Alamo Victory transported goods, mail, food and other supplies. About 90 percent of the cargo was moved by Merchant Marine Naval to the Korea War Zone. SS Alamo Victory made trips between the US and Korea helping American forces engaged against Communist aggression in South Korea. In 1951 she was put back into the National Defense Reserve Fleet at Suisun Bay.

== Vietnam War ==
In 1965 she was reactivated for the Vietnam War. Alamo Victory served as Merchant Marine Naval ship supplying goods to Vietnam. On August 18, 1969, she ran aground and was wrecked in Hurricane Camille at Gulfport, Mississippi in the Gulf of Mexico. She was refloated and laid up at the Beaumont Reserve Fleet National Defense Reserve in Texas. In 1971 she was scrapped in New Orleans.

== See also ==
- List of Victory ships
- Liberty ship
- Type C1 ship
- Type C2 ship
- Type C3 ship

== Sources ==
- Sawyer, L.A. and W.H. Mitchell. Victory ships and tankers: The history of the ‘Victory’ type cargo ships and of the tankers built in the United States of America during World War II, Cornell Maritime Press, 1974, 0-87033-182-5.
- United States Maritime Commission: Victory Ships alphabetical list War II
- Victory Cargo Ships Oregon Shipyards Record Breakers Page 2
