= SS Aloha State =

History
- Name: Sea Snipe (1942–47); Edward Luckenbach (1947–60); Aloha State (1960–71)
- Owner: United States Maritime Commission; Luckenbach Steamship Co. (1948-59); States Marine Lines (1959-71)
- Operator: War Shipping Administration by American President Lines, Ltd. (1943-46); British Ministry of War Transport (1946); Luckenbach Steamship Co. (1948-59); States Marine Lines (1959-71)
- Port of registry: United States
- Builder: Western Pipe and Steel Company
- Yard number: 84
- Laid down: August 8, 1942
- Launched: December 7, 1942
- Christened: December 7, 1942, by Mrs. Frank F. Kane
- Completed: 29 May 1943
- Maiden voyage: August 13, 1943
- In service: May 29, 1943
- Out of service: August 4, 1971
- Fate: Scrapped in August 1971, Kaohsiung, Taiwan
- Notes: Official number: 243297; Call letters: KOIQ

General characteristics
- Displacement: 7,870 tons
- Length: 492 ft (150 m)
- Beam: 69.7 ft (21.2 m)
- Draft: 29.4 ft (9.0 m)
- Decks: 2 decks and one shelter deck
- Propulsion: Twin General Electric boilers, single screw shaft

Aloha State built by Western Pipe and Steel Company, San Francisco, as Sea Snipe for the United States Maritime Commission as a standard Type C3-S-A2 transport ship. The ship was one of the first of the standard vessels modified into a troop transport. Sea Snipe was completed 29 May 1943 and delivered to the War Shipping Administration (WSA) upon completion. American President Lines operated the ship throughout the war under a WSA agreement. The ship, after brief charter to the British Ministry of War Transport in 1946 and lay up in 1947 served as a civilian transport ship for 24 years, first as Edward Luckenbach for Luckenbach Steamship Company then Aloha State for States Marine Lines. The ship was scrapped in August 1971.

== World War II ==
Sea Snipe was capable of transporting 2,194 troops and 225,500 cubic feet (6,390 m^{3}) of cargo. Its maiden voyage commenced on August 13, 1943, en route to Townsville, Queensland, where it would haul both US and Australian troops to various locations in New Guinea, Indonesia, and the South Pacific until return to San Francisco in November. The ship immediately made a round trip to Brisbane returning 5 January 1944. Sea Snipe then made four round trip voyages from San Francisco in 1944.

- Departure on 20 January for Milne Bay, Brisbane, Oro Bay, Buna and Langemak.
- Departure on 9 April for Milne Bay, Oro Bay, Lae, Langemak, Finschhafen, Cape Gloucester (Papua New Guinea) and Brisbane.
- Departure on 8 July to Milne Bay, Oro Bay, Finschhafen, Manus Island, Hollandia and Brisbane.
- Departure on 18 October to Guadalcanal, Milne Bay, Oro Bay, Hollandia, Brisbane and Bougainville with end of year return to San Francisco on 31 December.

The ship made two more Pacific voyages in 1945. The first departed San Francisco 6 February for Finschhafen, Hollandia, Leyte, Lingayen, Subic Bay and Manila with return to Los Angeles. On 22 May the ship departed San Diego for Pearl Harbor, Eniwetok and Guam returning to San Francisco in July. Later in July Sea Snipe departed for the Atlantic and Marseille for redeployment of troops to the Pacific.

Instead, with the Pacific war ended, the ship was redirected to Hampton Roads from which another round trip to Marseille was made returning on 27 September. From Baltimore the ship went to Le Havre, returned to Boston, then Naples back to Boston. Another voyage was made to Naples with return to Hampton Roads then back to Le Havre. The ship then went to New York in December with more voyages scheduled. Serious boiler problems required major maintenance and cancellation of the scheduled 1946 voyages. On 29 May 1946 the ship was allocated to the Ministry of War Transport under a bareboat charter.

== Civilian Service ==
In 1947, the United States Maritime Commission, who owned the ship, sold Sea Snipe to Luckenbach Steamship, after major repairs on the boiler were made. Luckenbach was purchasing many ex-World War II transports, to make up for ships that were lost in the war. Luckenbach, as a result of major corporate reorganization, sold the ship to States Marine Lines in 1960. They renamed the ship Aloha State, and it served as an international cargo ship until 1971. It was scrapped sometime between August 21 and 31, 1971, in Kaohsiung, Taiwan.
