= States Marine Lines, Inc. =

Passengers and Shipping Company

States Marine Lines
- House flag
- Industry: Maritime transport
- Founded: 1930
- Founder: Henry Mercer
- Defunct: 1974
- Headquarters: New York, New York
- Area served: Worldwide
- Key people: Cornelius S. Walsh
- Services: Cargo and Passengers Liners

States Marine Lines was the passenger and cargo of the States Marine Corporation founded by Henry Mercer in 1930 in New York City. In 1931 Cornelius S. Walsh became an investor and the company Secretary. They started by chartering foreign ships to run the lines in tramp trade. Later scheduled cargo services was added to the line. In 1934 States Marine started monthly cargo routes to South Africa.

In 1937 States Marine charted the SS Carrollton a 1903, 1,732 tons from, acquired by Saginaw Dock and Terminal Company of Cleveland, Ohio. In 1940 States Marine Lines purchased the SS Lone Star a 1919, 5,101 tons cargo ship from Mississippi Shipping Company of New Orleans and the SS Wolverine, 1919, 4,990 tons, cargo ship from Export Steamship Company in New York City. In 1941 States Marine Lines charted the SS Atlantic Trader, 1918, 2,241 tons, a cargo ship from Saginaw Dock and Terminal Company of Cleveland. In 1941 States Marine Lines charted the SS Green Mountain, a 1919, 4,988 tons, a cargo ship from Federal Marine Corp. of New York. In 1941 States Marine Lines charted the SS Hoosier, 1920, a 5,060 tons cargo ship from Hoosier Marine Corp. of New York. In 1941 States Marine Lines charted the SS Keystone, 1919, a 5,565 tons, cargo ship from Shepard Steamship Company of Boston, MA.

On 10 July 1942 SS Hoosier was sunk by the U-boat U-376 after departing Archangel, USSR. On March 13, 1943, the SS Keystone sunk by U-172 after her engine failed in convoy UGS-6 from New York to North Africa.

During World War II the States Marine Lines was active with charter shipping with the Maritime Commission and War Shipping Administration. During wartime, the Mississippi Shipping Company operated Victory ships, Liberty ships, and a few Empire ships.

== World War II ==
Victory Ship

- SS Benjamin Hawkins
- World War II Victory ships:
- SS Mercer Victory
- SS Morgantown Victory
- SS Westerly Victory
- SS Hugh J. Kilpatrick
- World War II 1920 ships:
  - Chipana, 1920, 3,280 tons, from Grace Steamship Lines of New York.
  - Curaca, 1920, 3,280 tons, from New Orleans and South American Steamship Company.

== Post World War II ==
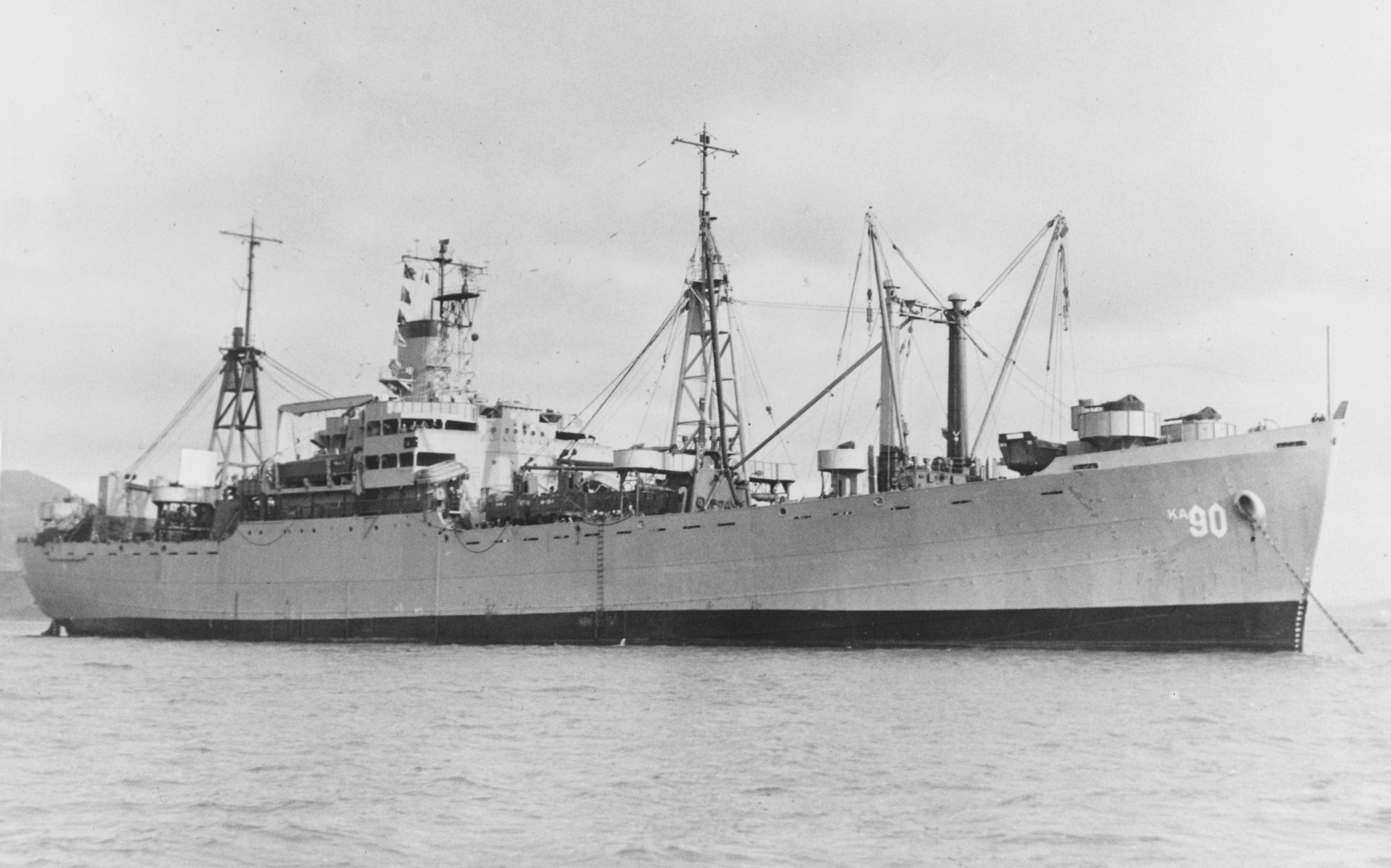
Type C2 ship in San Francisco Bay

After World War II there were many low-cost ships for sales, States Marine Lines was now able to own more ships than charter. States Marine Lines continued to charter both U.S. and foreign ships.

- States Marine Lines purchased from the U.S. Maritime Commission Type C2 ships:
- SS Cotton State, C2, 1946, 6,103 tons
- SS Empire State, C2, 1945, 6,214 tons
- SS Garden State, C2, 1946, 6,103
- SS Golden State, C2, 1946, 6,103 tons
- SS Hoosier State, EC2, 1944, 7,280 tons
- SS Keystone State, EC2, 1944, 7,210 tons
- SS Magnolia State, C2, 1946, 6,103 tons
- SS Old Dominion State, EC2, 1944, 7,210 tons
- SS Palmetto State, EC2, 1945, 7,207 tons
- SS Volunteer State, EC2, 1944, 7,216 tons
- SS Constitution State, 1943

In 1947 States Marine Lines sold off Atlantic Trader, Green Mountain, Wolverine, Blue Grass State, Evergreen State, Lone Star State, Peach Tree State. In 1947 States Marine purchased controlling interest in the South African Marine Corp., also called Safmarine.

== Korean War ==
States Marine Lines served as Merchant Marine Naval shipping company, supplying goods for the Korean War. Ships made trips to and from Korea. About 75 percent of the personnel taken to Korea for the Korean War came by the Merchant Marine Ships. States Marine Lines transported goods, mail, food and other supplies. About 90 percent of the cargo was moved by Merchant Marine Naval to the Korea War Zone. States Marine Lines made trips between the US and Korea helping American forces engaged against Communist aggression in South Korea. After the war most ships were put into the National Defense Reserve Fleet.

- United States Merchant Marine ships:
- SS Alamo Victory
- SS Brigham Victory
- SS Beatrice Victory
- SS Earlham Victory
- SS Grove City Victory
- SS Kenyon Victory
- SS Loma Victory
- SS Oberlin Victory
- SS Occidental Victory
- SS Ouachita Victory
- SS Sharon Victory
- SS Twin Falls Victory
- SS Wesleyan Victory

== Post Korean ==
In 1954 States Marine took over management of Bloomfield Steamship Company in Houston, Texas, which was closed in 1969. Bloomfield was founded on post World War II low-cost ships by Ben M. Bloomfield. In 1954 Old Dominion State and Wolverine State are sold off.

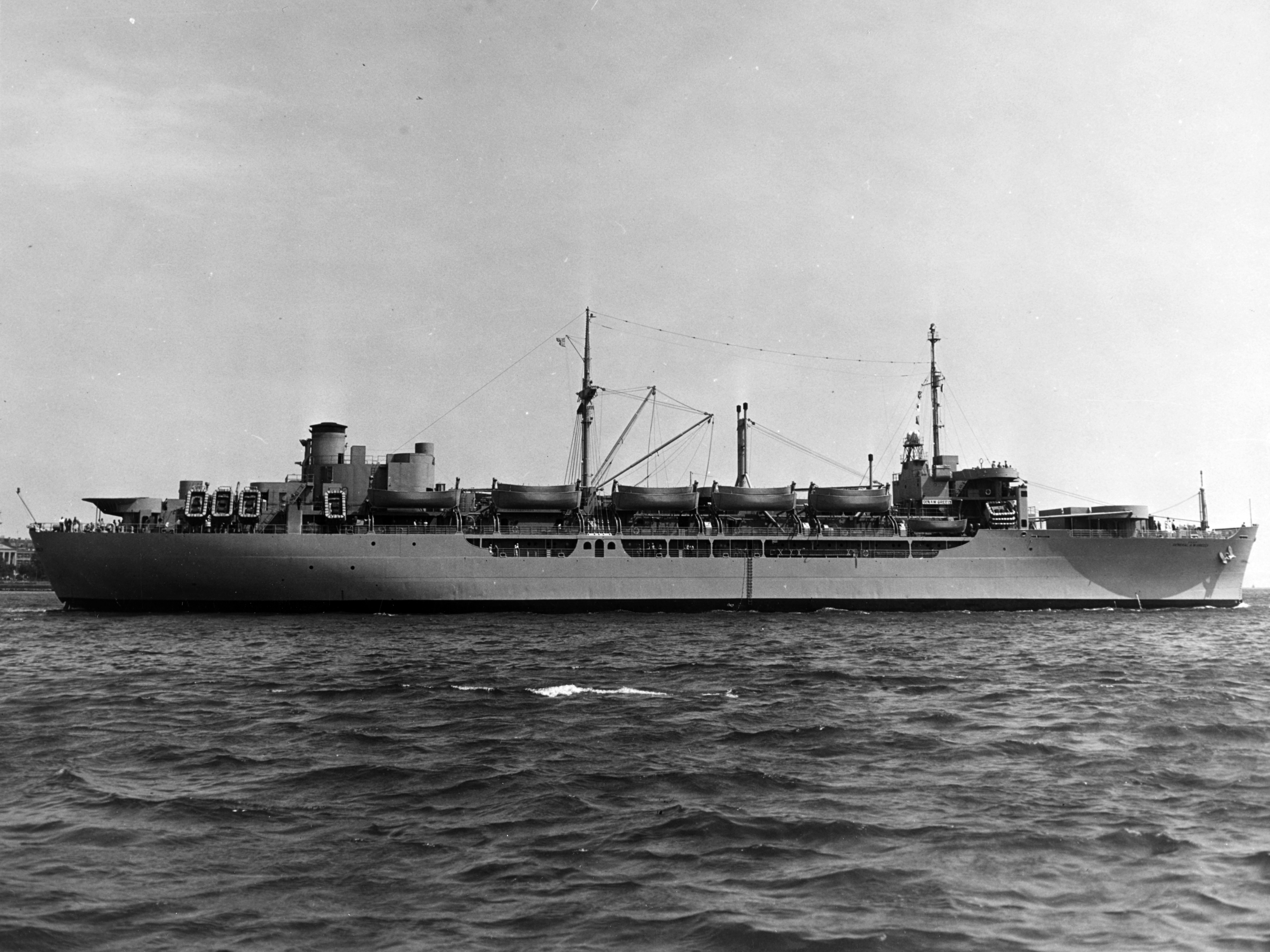
General G.O. Squier-class USNS General A.W. Greely (T-AP-141) a C4 cargo ship in the early 1950s

In 1955 States Marine purchased four 1945, 10,780 tons Type C4-class ships from the Joshua Hendy Corp. Second Hoosier State, Second Keystone State, Second Wolverine State, and the second Lone Star State. In 1957 States Marine purchased four 1945 Victory ships each former line ship names Cotton State, Magnolia State, Palmetto State, and Volunteer State. States Marine also took on charters for the: Alma Victory, Beloit Victory, Binghampton Victory, Britain Victory, Clovis Victory, Creighton Victory, Iran Victory, Knox Victory Clovis Victory, Rock Springs Victory and Simmons Victory. In 1960 States Marine purchased: 7,868 tons C2 ships: SSBadger State, Bay State, Bayou State, Evergreen State, Blue Grass State, and Buckeye State,, (2), C3, 1943, 7,868 tons. Also Type C3: Copper State, SS Aloha State, and Gopher State, SS Steel Director

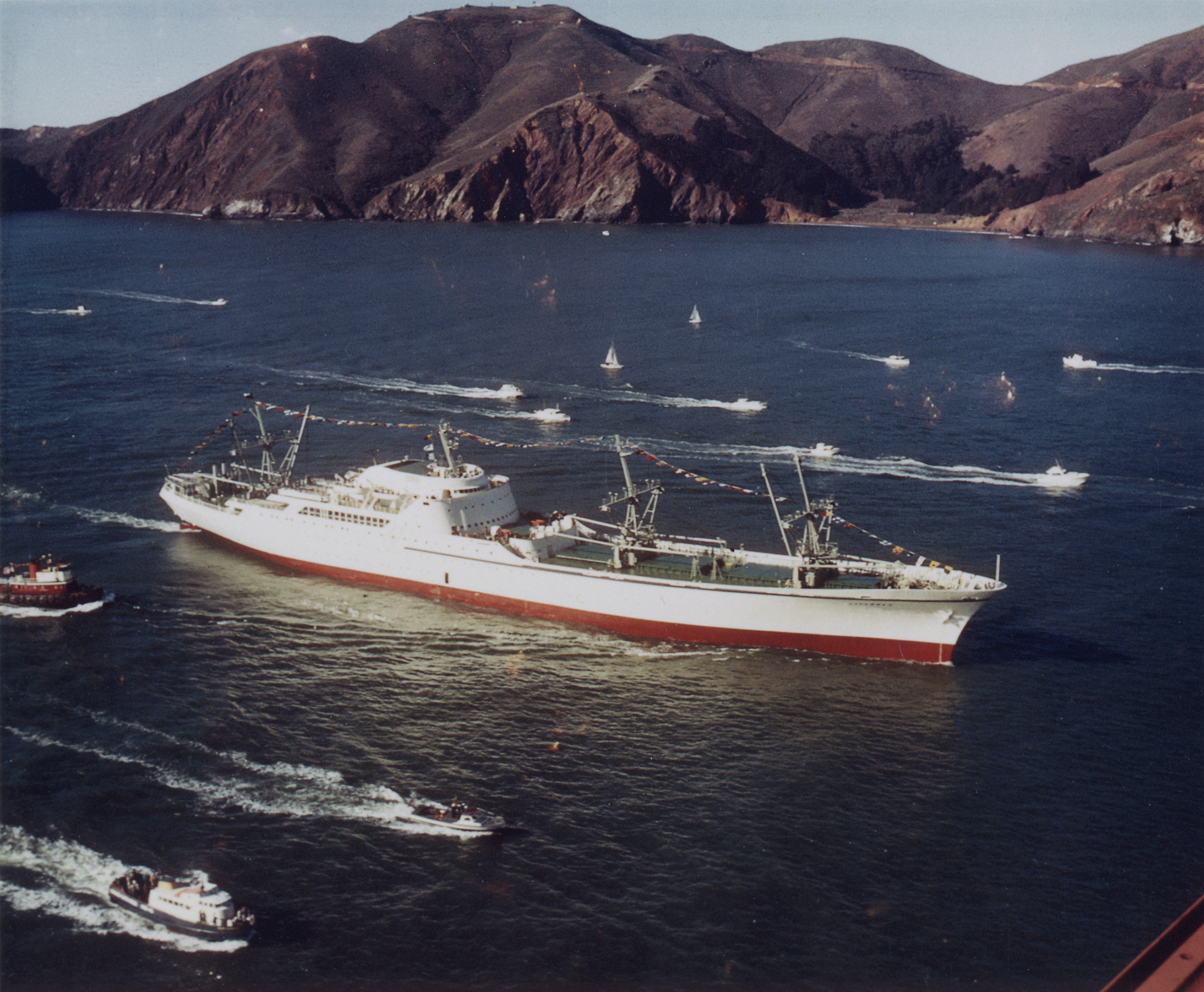
NS Savannah near the Golden Gate Bridge in 1962, managed by States Marine

== Nuclear-powered cargo ship ==
In 1962 States Marine took over management of the first nuclear-powered cargo ship, NS Savannah. Built in 1958 at 13,559 tons, States Marine managed the ship for the U.S. Department of Commerce for one year.

== Vietnam War ==
For the Vietnam War States Marine operated the charter for the SS Gainesville Victory. Also, in 1965 Henry Mercer purchased Cornelius Walsh shares in the company and purchase the Waterman Steamship Corporation. States Marine also supported the Vietnam War with line owned ships and ships charter.

States Marine failed to upgrade to container ships and modernize as other shipping lines did in the 1970s and with the Vietnam War over States Marine closed in 1974, all ships being sold or scrapped due to age.

== See also ==
- Moragne v. States Marine Lines, Inc.
