= SS Benjamin Hawkins =

Liberty ship of WWII

History

United States
- Name: Benjamin Hawkins
- Namesake: Benjamin Hawkins
- Owner: War Shipping Administration (WSA)
- Operator: States Marine Corporation
- Ordered: as type (EC2-S-C1) hull, MCE hull 913
- Awarded: 1 January 1942
- Builder: Bethlehem-Fairfield Shipyard, Baltimore, Maryland
- Cost: $1,042,994
- Yard number: 2063
- Way number: 6
- Laid down: 30 July 1942
- Launched: 7 September 1942
- Sponsored by: Mrs. Lelia W. Wright
- Completed: 22 September 1942
- Identification: Call sign: KHCR
- Fate: Laid up in the Hudson River Reserve Fleet, Jones Point, New York, 13 May 1948; Laid up in the National Defense Reserve Fleet, Wilmington, North Carolina, 15 July 1952; Laid up in the James River Reserve Fleet, Lee Hall, Virginia, 4 October 1957; Sold for scrapping, 4 December 1972, withdrawn from fleet, 31 January 1973

General characteristics
- Class & type: Liberty ship; type EC2-S-C1, standard
- Tonnage: 10,865 LT DWT; 7,176 GRT
- Displacement: 3,380 long tons (3,434 t) (light); 14,245 long tons (14,474 t) (max)
- Length: 441 feet 6 inches (135 m) oa; 416 feet (127 m) pp; 427 feet (130 m) lwl
- Beam: 57 feet (17 m)
- Draft: 27 ft 9.25 in (8.4646 m)
- Installed power: 2 × Oil fired 450 °F (232 °C) boilers, operating at 220 psi (1,500 kPa); 2,500 hp (1,900 kW)
- Propulsion: 1 × triple-expansion steam engine, (manufactured by General Machinery Corp., Hamilton, Ohio); 1 × screw propeller
- Speed: 11.5 knots (21.3 km/h; 13.2 mph)
- Capacity: 562,608 cubic feet (15,931 m^{3}) (grain); 499,573 cubic feet (14,146 m^{3}) (bale)
- Complement: 38–62 USMM; 21–40 USNAG
- Armament: Varied by ship; Bow-mounted 3-inch (76 mm)/50-caliber gun; Stern-mounted 4-inch (102 mm)/50-caliber gun; 2–8 × single 20-millimeter (0.79 in) Oerlikon anti-aircraft (AA) cannons and/or, 2–8 × 37-millimeter (1.46 in) M1 AA guns

SS Benjamin Hawkins was a Liberty ship built in the United States during World War II. She was named after Benjamin Hawkins, an American planter, statesman, and US Indian agent. He was a delegate to the Continental Congress and a United States senator from North Carolina. Appointed by George Washington as General Superintendent for Indian Affairs (1796–1818), he had responsibility for the Native American tribes south of the Ohio River, and was principal Indian agent to the Creek Indians.

== Construction ==
Benjamin Hawkins was laid down on 30 July 1942, under a Maritime Commission (MARCOM) contract, MCE hull 913, by the Bethlehem-Fairfield Shipyard, Baltimore, Maryland; she was sponsored by Mrs. Lelia M. Knight, the mother of a yard employee, and was launched on 7 September 1942.

== History ==
She was allocated to States Marine Corporation, on 22 September 1942. On 13 May 1948, she was laid up in the Hudson River Reserve Fleet, Jones Point, New York. She was withdrawn from the fleet on 7 July 1949, to be loaded with grain, returning 18 July 1949, full. On 19 January 1950, she was withdrawn to unload grain, returning empty on 31 January 1950. On 2 August 1950, she was withdrawn from the fleet to be loaded with grain, returning full on 10 August 1950. On 26 January 1951, she was withdrawn to be unloaded, she returned empty on 6 February 1951. She was laid up in the National Defense Reserve Fleet, Wilmington, North Carolina, 15 July 1952. On 4 October 1957, she was laid up in the James River Reserve Fleet, Lee Hall, Virginia. On 4 December 1972, she was sold for scrapping to N. V. Intershitra, for $103,450. She was removed from the fleet on 31 January 1973.

== Bibliography ==
- "Bethlehem-Fairfield, Baltimore MD". www.ShipbuildingHistory.com. 14 August 2008.
- Maritime Administration. "Benjamin Hawkins". Ship History Database Vessel Status Card. U.S. Department of Transportation, Maritime Administration.
- Davies, James (May 2004). "Specifications (As-Built)" (PDF). p. 23.
- "SS Benjamin Hawkins".
