= USS Starlight =

WWII US naval vessel

Coordinates: 40°06′35″N 167°27′25″W

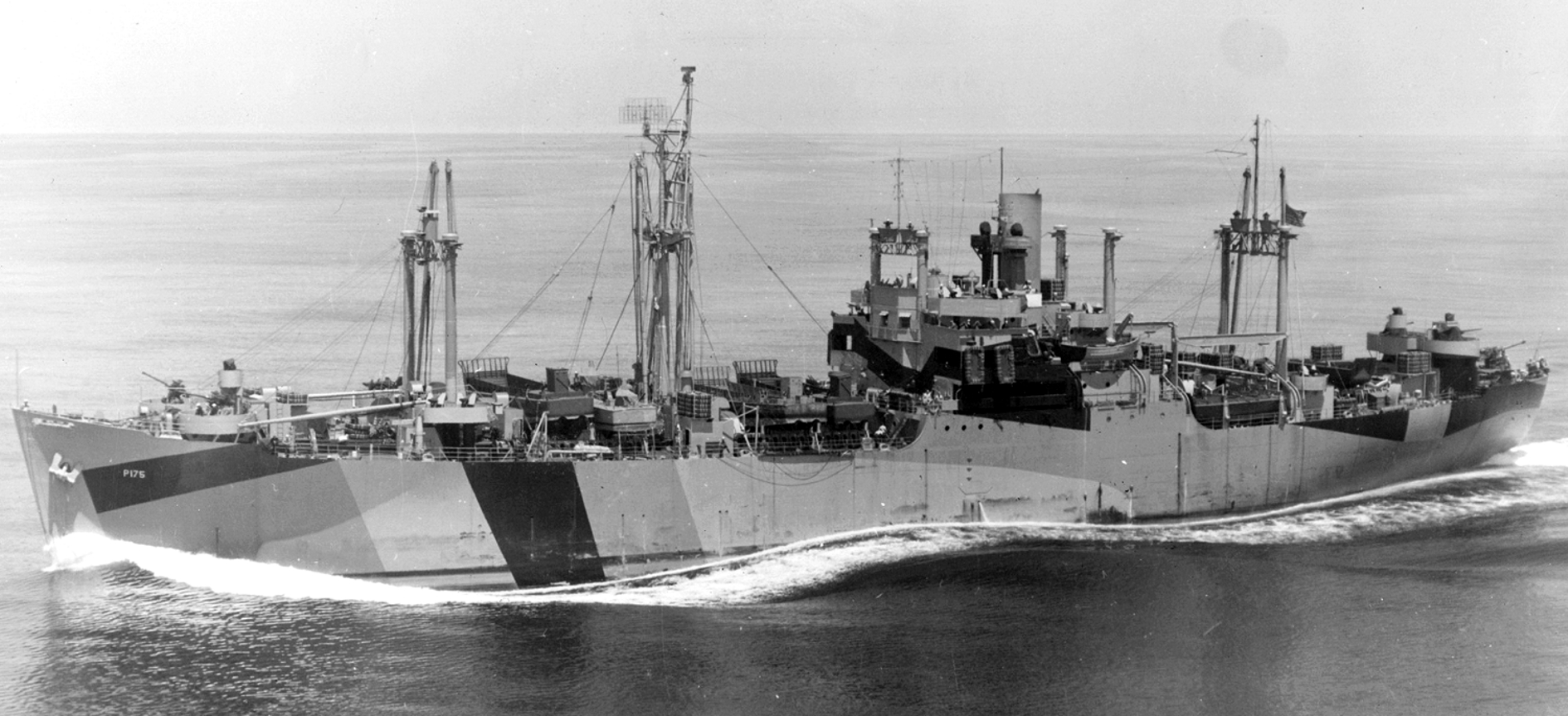
- USS Starlight (AP-175)

History

United States
- Name: USS Starlight
- Builder: North Carolina Shipbuilding Company, Wilmington, North Carolina
- Laid down: 9 October 1943
- Launched: 23 December 1943
- Commissioned: 15 February 1944
- Decommissioned: 12 August 1946
- Renamed: SS Badger State
- Stricken: 28 August 1946
- Honors and awards: 4 battle stars (World War II)
- Fate: Sold into merchant service, 1948; Sank 5 January 1970

General characteristics
- Class & type: Storm King-class transport
- Displacement: 13,910 long tons (14,133 t) full
- Length: 459 ft 2 in (139.95 m)
- Beam: 63 ft (19 m)
- Draft: 23 ft (7.0 m)
- Speed: 16.5 knots (30.6 km/h; 19.0 mph)
- Troops: 1,375
- Complement: 360
- Armament: 1 × 5"/38 caliber gun; 4 × 3"/50 caliber guns; 12 × 20 mm AA guns

USS Starlight (AP-175) was a United States Navy Storm King-class auxiliary transport in commission from 1944 to 1945. She was designed as a troop carrier. After her naval service she became the civilian cargo ship SS Badger State. She sank in January 1970 after an explosion of a cargo of munitions on 26 December 1969, with the loss of 26 of her crew of 40.

== Construction and commissioning ==
USS Starlight was laid down on 9 October 1943 as SS Starlight (MC hull 1358) by the North Carolina Shipbuilding Company at Wilmington, North Carolina. launched on 23 December 1943, sponsored by Mrs. M. T. Solomon. Acquired by the U.S. Navy from the War Shipping Administration on a bareboat charter, she was converted into an auxiliary transport by the Bethlehem Shipbuilding Corporation at Staten Island, New York and was commissioned on 15 February 1944.

== Service history ==
=== 1944 ===
Starlight, as an auxiliary transport, was assigned to the Naval Transportation Service for duty. Her sea trials took place in Long Island Sound; and she steamed to Hampton Roads, Virginia, to begin her shakedown cruise. She remained there from 12 May to 5 June 1944, when she weighed anchor for the Panama Canal and the Hawaiian Islands. The transport arrived at Pearl Harbor, Hawaii, on 26 June 1944 and was assigned to Transport Division (TransDiv) 38.

The 305th Regimental Combat Team of the United States Army′s 77th Infantry Division was combat-loaded on board on 1 July 1944 and TransDiv 38 sailed for Eniwetok in the Marshall Islands the next day. There, Starlight joined other units of Task Group (TG) 53.2, Assault Group Four, for the amphibious assault on Guam in the Mariana Islands. The task group sortied on 17 July and, four days later, landed the assault troops on the beaches. Starlight remained in the combat area until 29 July 1944. She was loaded with United States Marine Corps combat casualties for evacuation, and steamed, via Eniwetok, to Pearl Harbor.

Starlight arrived at Pearl Harbor on 10 August 1944. After a few repairs were made and the ship was provisioned, Regimental Combat Team 32 of the U.S. Army's 7th Infantry Division was embarked for amphibious assault training. On 17 September 1944, she sailed for the invasion of Yap in the Caroline Islands, but these orders were cancelled two days after she left port. Her new orders routed the ship via the Marshall Islands and the Admiralty Islands to the Philippines. As a unit of Attack Group Able, Starlight landed troops on the Dulag beachhead on the Philippine island of Leyte on 20 October 1944 as the invasion of Leyte began. When all troops had been disembarked from TransDiv 38, it sailed for Hollandia, New Guinea, as part of a "turn-around" resupply operation. Starlight returned to Leyte on 18 November 1944 with replacements for combat casualties, which she unloaded in eight hours under Japanese air attack. Starlight shot down two Japanese aircraft before steaming to Manus Island off New Guinea and Empress Augusta Bay off Bougainville in the Solomon Islands for amphibious training of the 145th Regimental Combat Team of the U.S. Army's 37th Infantry Division. Starlight returned to Manus on 21 December 1944 and sortied late in the month with Task Group 79.1 for Luzon in the Philippines.

=== 1945 ===
During the Invasion of Lingayen Gulf, Starlight landed troops on Binmaley Beach on the coast of Luzon in Lingayen Gulf on 9 January 1945 and remained there for three days during which she shot down two more Japanese planes. The ship returned to New Guinea on 22 January 1945, loaded troops of the U.S. Army's 41st Infantry Division, and landed them safely on Mindoro in the Philippines on 29 January 1945. She then sailed for Espiritu Santo in the New Hebrides and Lunga Point on Guadalcanal in the Solomon Islands to embark elements of Marine Air Group (MAG) 33 for delivery to Okinawa, which U.S. forces were scheduled to invade on 1 April 1945. Starlight embarked some elements at both ports and departed the Solomon Islands on 14 March 1945 for Manus Island, Ulithi, and Peleliu. As a unit of Amphibious Group 4, TF 53, she reached Okinawa on 11 April 1945 and unloaded her cargo at Hagushi Beach and Nago Bay. During the next week, she shot down two more Japanese planes. The ship returned to Ulithi on 24 April 1945 and was ordered to proceed to San Francisco, California, for an overhaul.

Starlight was at San Francisco from 12 May to 11 July 1945, when she departed for Manila in the Philippines with elements of the U.S. Army's 780th Field Artillery Battalion and the 554th Signal Depot Company embarked. After making calls at Eniwetok and Ulithi, she unloaded the troops at Manila during the first week of August 1945. Starlight was steaming from Manila to Pearl Harbor when she received news of the Japanese surrender on 15 August 1945 (14 August 1945 in the United States). She shuttled troops between Saipan, Tinian, and Guam in the Mariana Islands and Sasebo, Japan, until routed to the west coast of the United States in mid-December 1945.

=== 1946 ===
Starlight arrived at San Pedro, California, on 2 January 1946. She loaded U.S. Marines there and transported them to Tientsin, China, where she disembarked them on 9 February 1946. Through June 1946, she made two more voyages from the U.S. West Coast to the East Asia.

On 5 July 1946, Starlight stood out of San Francisco en route to the United States East Coast and inactivation. She arrived at Naval Station Norfolk in Norfolk, Virginia, on 20 July 1946. She was decommissioned on 12 August 1946, transferred to the United States Maritime Commission on 14 August 1946, and struck from the Navy list on 28 August 1946.

== Later service and loss ==
The ship was sold to States Marine Lines, Inc. in 1948 and renamed the SS Badger State. She operated for over 20 years as a commercial cargo ship.

In 1969, Badger State was hired under contract with the Military Sea Transportation Service, and she departed from Naval Weapons Station Bangor in Bremerton, Washington, around 12 December 1969 bound for Da Nang, South Vietnam, with a full load of 8,900 bombs, rockets, artillery shells, and mines for use in the Vietnam War. As the ship made her way across the North Pacific Ocean she encountered heavy weather roughly 550 nautical miles (1,019 km) north of Midway Atoll on 17 December 1969 and began to roll heavily in the growing waves and howling winds. As the ship rolled from side to side, the securing bands on her dangerous cargo began to give way, threatening to let the bombs come loose on board, meaning almost certain destruction of the ship and loss of her crew. Racing to re-secure the cargo in the midst of a major storm, the crew of Badger State used everything they could to shore up the dangerous load of munitions, including mattresses, hatch boards, spare lifejackets, chairs, linen, stores, mooring lines, and even frozen meat.

For the next nine days the fight to save the ship continued as she was lashed by ferocious weather, her master Captain Charles T. Wilson, trying several different courses to minimize the ship's side-to-side movement in the 20-foot (6.1-meter) seas. All efforts to secure the dangerous cargo were ineffective as the bombs broke through the materials blocking and bracing them and began to roll freely around the ship, striking her inner hull with enough force to punch holes and allow water to enter the ship. Terrified crew members continued to do everything they could to prevent or lessen the movement of the cargo until the morning of 26 December 1969, when a single bomb detonated in cargo hold No. 5.

While the explosion was not a full-force detonation, it blew a 12-by-8-foot (3.7-by-2.4-meter) hole in Badger State′s starboard side and started a large fire on her stern. The order to abandon ship went out immediately despite the continuing bad weather, which was then lashing the ship with 25-foot (7.6-meter) waves and 40-knot (74-km) winds. No sooner had the crew unlashed two rubber liferafts than the howling winds tore them off the deck of the ship. Two other rubber liferafts were lowered into the water, only to be overturned and throwing two men into the water. With the rubber rafts gone and of the ship's two lifeboats having been damaged by the high seas, 35 men – the entire ship's complement except for Captain Wilson and a skeleton crew of five men who volunteered to remain on board – had to squeeze into the one remaining lifeboat.

The lifeboat was being lowered into the water along the starboard side of the ship when it passed the massive hole blown in the ship's hull, where the men in the boat could see clearly the entire cargo of bombs rolling back and forth in the hold, which was still on fire. As the lifeboat hit the water's surface, a wave immediately slammed it into the hull of Badger State. The wave's and lifeboat's impact also shook a 2000-pound (907-kg) bomb loose from Badger State′s No. 5 hold. The bomb rolled across the bottom of the hold and straight out of the hole in the ship's hull, and it landed on the side of the full lifeboat, capsizing it and sending all 35 men into the 48-degree F (6-degree C) water.

Captain Wilson and the skeleton crew still aboard Badger State immediately dropped lines to the men in the water in an attempt to save them, and vectored the Greek cargo ship Khian Star, which had arrived on the scene in response to Badger State′s distress call, to the men, who now were scattered in the water around Badger State. Rescue in the heavy seas proved almost impossible, as many of the men in the water were washed away by the surging waves as they were being pulled up to the decks of Khian Star. By daybreak on 27 December 1969, Khian Star had recovered only 14 of the men who had been in the lifeboat; the other 21 were never seen alive again.

By this point the fires aboard Badger State were beginning to set off other munitions, and the cargo in her forward two holds had come loose and was in danger of detonating at any moment. After sending a final message from the ship, Captain Wilson and his remaining crew abandoned ship and swam for Khian Star through 20-foot (6.1-meter) seas. Of the five men, only three survived the swim. Captain Wilson was among the survivors.

Now totally abandoned and powerless, Badger State was slowly consumed by fire from the stern forward, and was rocked by numerous detonations as she drifted around the North Pacific for the next ten days. U.S. Navy ships arrived on the scene to assess the situation and look into the possibility of saving the ship and what remained of her cargo, but the fire and explosions led to a decision to sink Badger State with gunfire as a hazard to navigation. As the fleet ocean tug USS Abnaki (ATF-96) began to close in on Badger State to open fire, however, Badger State broke up and sank on 5 January 1970. Twenty-nine members of her crew had died in the disaster.

The United States Secretary of Transportation later awarded the Merchant Marine Gallant Ship Citation to Khian Star for efforts to assist the survivors of Badger State.

== Awards ==
Starlight received four battle stars for World War II service.

== Notes ==
Citations

References used

- This article incorporates text from the public domain Dictionary of American Naval Fighting Ships. The entry can be found here.
- Benedetto, William R. (2005). Sailing into the Abyss: A True Story of Extreme Heroism on the High Seas. New York, New York: Citadel Press. ISBN 978-0-8065-2634-8.
