= McRoss, West Virginia =

- Unincorporated community
- Location within West Virginia Location within the United States
- Coordinates: 37°59′19″N 80°44′54″W
- Country: United States
- State: West Virginia
- County: Greenbrier
- Elevation: 2,408 ft (734 m)
- Time zone: UTC-5 (Eastern (EST))
  - Summer (DST): UTC-4 (EDT)
- Area codes: 304 & 681
- GNIS feature ID: 1555090

McRoss is an unincorporated community in Greenbrier County, West Virginia, United States. McRoss is located on U.S. Route 60, northeast of Rainelle.
