= Anjean, West Virginia =

Unincorporated community in West Virginia, United States

- Unincorporated community
- Location within West Virginia Location within the United States
- Coordinates: 38°01′12″N 80°37′59″W
- Country: United States
- State: West Virginia
- County: Greenbrier
- Elevation: 2,684 ft (818 m)
- Time zone: UTC-5 (Eastern (EST))
  - Summer (DST): UTC-4 (EDT)
- Area codes: 304 & 681
- GNIS feature ID: 1553730

Anjean is an unincorporated community in Greenbrier County, West Virginia, United States. Anjean is 5 miles (8.0 km) northeast of Rupert.

The name Anjean is an amalgamation of Ann and Jean, the relatives of a mine proprietor.
