= List of retired Atlantic hurricane names =

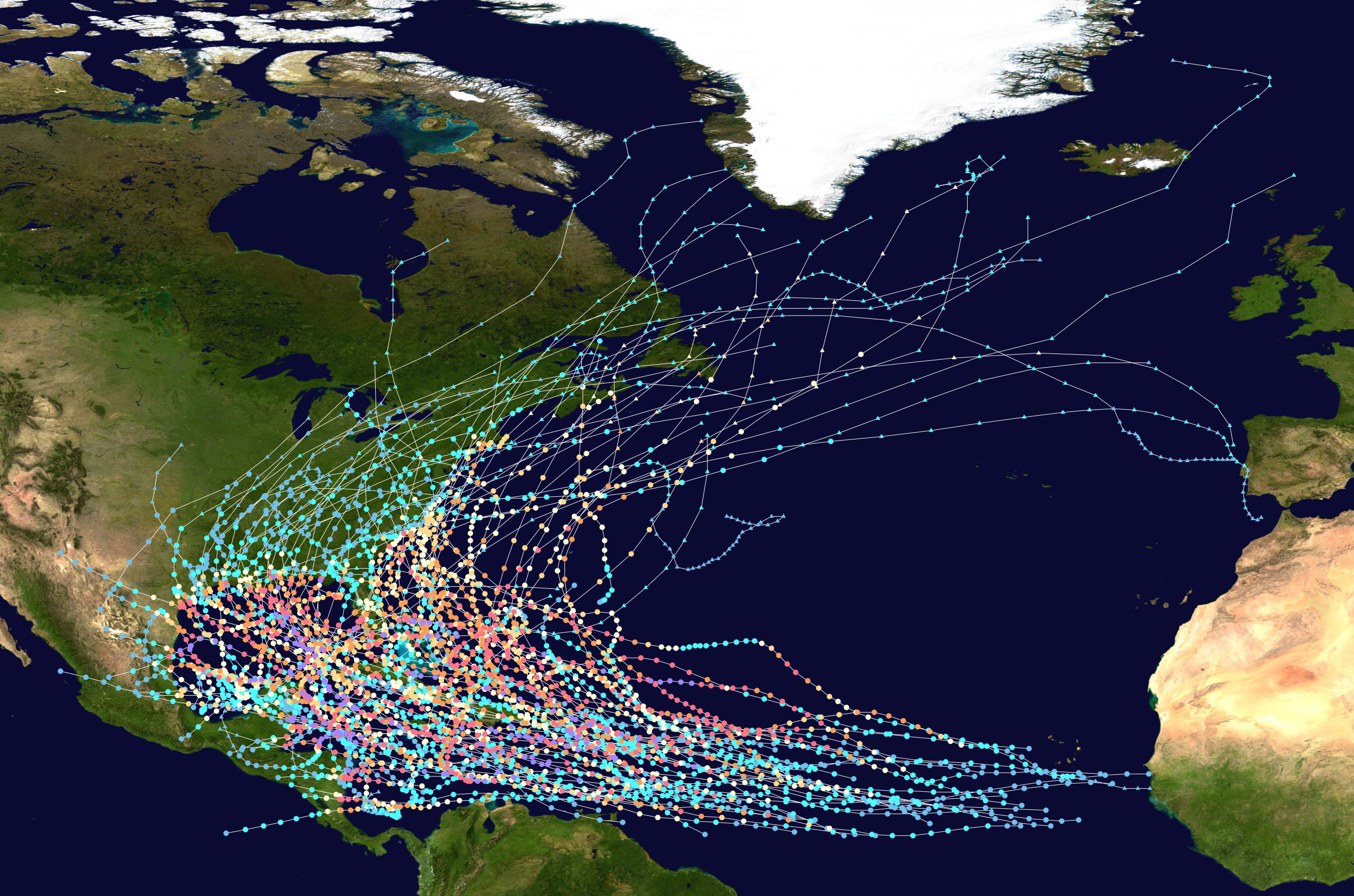
Tracks of all retired Atlantic hurricane names from 1954 to 2024

This is a cumulative list of previously used tropical cyclone (tropical storm and hurricane) names that have been permanently removed from reuse in the North Atlantic basin. As of 2026, 100 storm names have been retired.

The naming of North Atlantic tropical cyclones is currently under the oversight of the Hurricane Committee of the World Meteorological Organization (WMO). This group maintains six alphabetic lists of twenty-one names, with one list used each year. This normally results in each name being reused every six years. However, in the case of a particularly deadly or damaging storm, that storm's name is retired, and a replacement starting with the same letter is selected to take its place. The decision on whether to remove a name in a given season is made at the annual session of the WMO Hurricane Committee in the spring of the following year.

The practice of retiring storm names was begun by the United States Weather Bureau in 1955, after major hurricanes Carol, Edna, and Hazel struck the Northeastern United States during the previous year. Initially, their names were retired for 10 years, after which time they could be reintroduced; however, in 1969, the policy was changed to have the names retired permanently. In 1977, the United States National Oceanic and Atmospheric Administration (NOAA) transferred control of the naming lists to the Hurricane Committee.

Since the formal start of naming during the 1947 Atlantic hurricane season, an average of one Atlantic storm name has been retired each year. However, many seasons (most recently 2023) did not have any names retired. The record for number of storm names retired from a single season is five, held by the 2005 season. The most names retired for a decade was 24 in the 2000s, followed by the 16 retirements resulting from hurricanes in the 2010s. The deadliest storm to have its name retired was Hurricane Mitch, which caused over 10,000 fatalities when it struck Central America in October 1998. The costliest storms were hurricanes Katrina in August 2005 and Harvey in August 2017; each storm struck the U.S. Gulf Coast, causing $125 billion in damage, much of it from flooding, followed by Ian in September 2022, causing $112 billion in damage from a combination of wind and flooding. (Note: Unless otherwise noted, all of the damage totals in this article are in the original year USD.) The most recent North Atlantic name to be retired was Melissa, following the 2025 season.

== History ==
During the latter stages of World War II, forecasters with the United States Armed Forces began informally naming tropical cyclones over the Pacific Ocean after their wives and sweethearts. In 1945, after the practice had become popular among forecasters who found that it reduced confusion during map discussions, the US military formalized the scheme and started to publicly assign female names to tropical cyclones in the Northern Hemisphere and male names to those in the Southern Hemisphere. At the time, attempts were made to persuade the United States Weather Bureau (USWB) to start using female names for Atlantic hurricanes, but the bureau wanted to be seen as a serious enterprise and felt that it was "not appropriate" to name tropical cyclones while warning the United States public. As a result, the USAF started to use the Joint Army/Navy Phonetic Alphabet to name significant tropical cyclones in the North Atlantic Ocean. These names were used over the next few years in internal communications between weather centres and reconnaissance aircraft and were excluded from public bulletins.

This practice continued until September 1950, when the names started to be used publicly after three hurricanes (Baker, Dog, Easy) had occurred simultaneously and caused confusion within the media and the public. Public use of the phonetic alphabet continued until the 1953 Interdepartmental Hurricane Conference, where the decision was made to start using a new list of female names during that season as a second phonetic alphabet had been developed. During the active but mild 1953 Atlantic hurricane season, the names were readily used in the press with few objections recorded; as a result, the same names were reused during the next year with only one change: Gilda for Gail. Over the next six years, a new list of names was developed ahead of each season; in 1960, forecasters developed four alphabetical sets and repeated them every four years. These new sets followed the example of the typhoon names and excluded names beginning with the letters Q, U, X, Y, and Z, and keeping them to female names only.

In 1955, it was decided to start retiring the names of significant tropical cyclones for 10 years, after which they might be reintroduced, with the names Carol and Edna reintroduced ahead of the 1965 and 1968 hurricane seasons, respectively. At the 1969 Interdepartmental Hurricane Conference, the naming lists were revised after it was decided that the names Carol, Edna, Hazel, and Inez would be permanently retired because of their importance to the research community. It was also decided that the name of any significant hurricane in the future would be permanently retired. Ahead of the 1971 Atlantic hurricane season, 10 lists of hurricane names were inaugurated, by the National Oceanic and Atmospheric Administration. In 1977, it was decided that the World Meteorological Organization's Hurricane Committee (WMO) would control the names used, who subsequently decided that six lists of names would be used in the Atlantic Ocean from 1979 onwards, with male names included. Since 1979, the same six lists have been used by the United States National Hurricane Center (NHC) to name systems, with names of significant tropical cyclones retired from the lists permanently and replaced with new names as required at the following year's hurricane committee meeting.

At present, the name of any tropical cyclone may be retired or withdrawn from the list of names at the request of a member state, if it acquires notoriety for various reasons, including the number of deaths, amount of damages, or other impacts. The committee subsequently discuss the proposal and either through building consensus or a majority vote decides if the name should be retired or withdrawn. In March 2017, members of the British Caribbean Territories proposed that a third retirement criterion be added: the tropical cyclone must have sustained winds of at least 96 mph (154 km/h). This came in light of the retirement of Tropical Storm Erika in 2015, which caused catastrophic flooding and mudslides in Dominica without producing sustained tropical storm-force winds on the island. No action has been taken on this proposal yet.

Formerly, if a season's primary list of names were fully used, subsequent storms would be assigned names based on the letters of the Greek alphabet. According to the WMO's initial policy established in 2006, the Greek letter named storms could never be retired "lest an irreplaceable chunk be taken out of the alphabet." Therefore, devastating 2020 hurricanes Eta and Iota would have been retired as "Eta 2020" and "Iota 2020" respectively, but the letter names themselves would remain available for use whenever Greek alphabet letter names were needed again in subsequent years. However, this plan was never implemented, as the names Eta and Iota were both formally retired without the year descriptor by the WMO in 2021. The organization also abandoned the Greek alphabet auxiliary list in favor of a new auxiliary naming list.

== Retired names by decade ==
=== 1950s ===
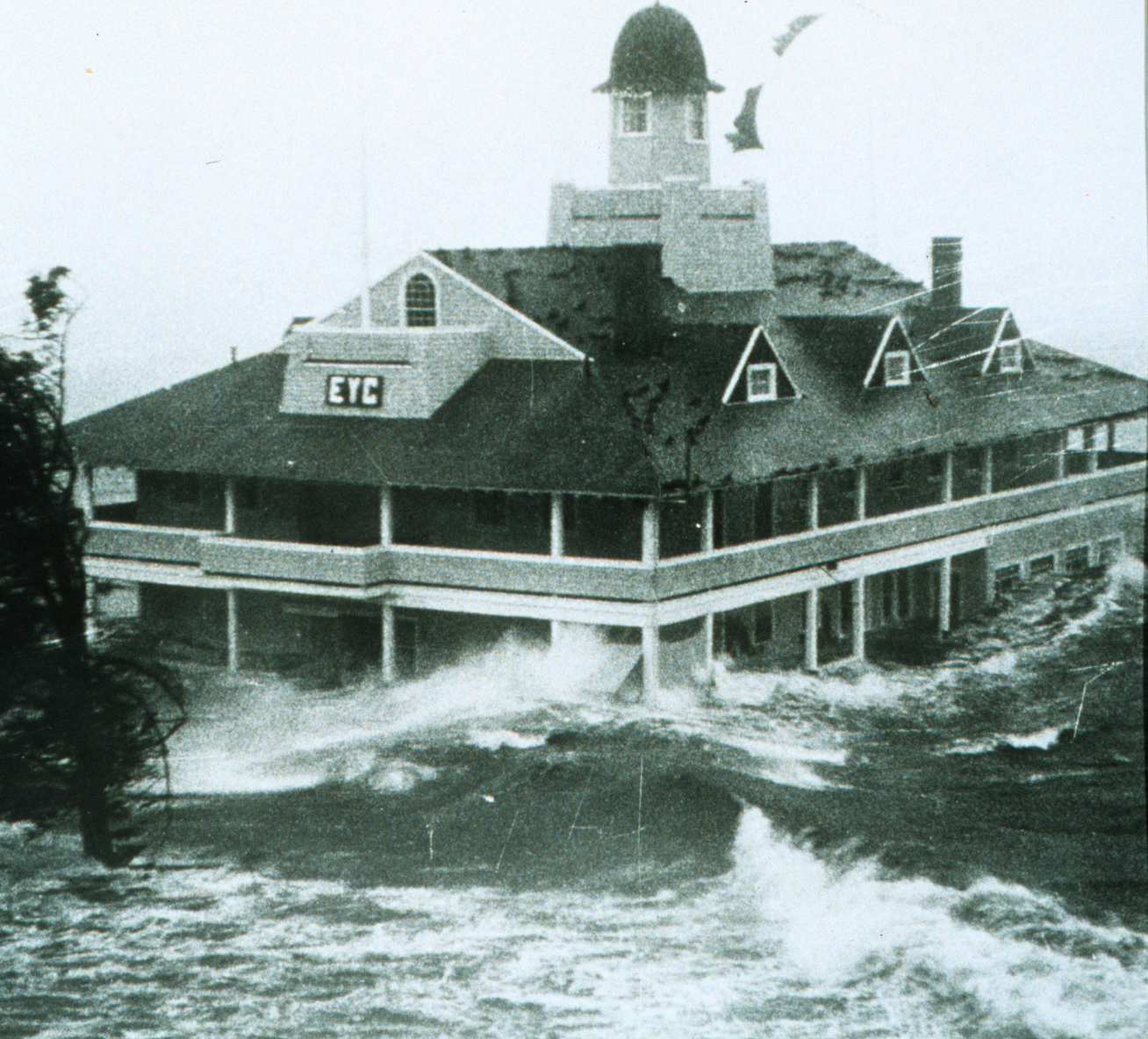
Storm surge from Hurricane Carol inundates the Edgewood Yacht Club in Rhode Island.

Between 1954 and 1959, eight names were deemed significant enough to be retired for 10 years due to their impact before being permanently retired after 1969. There were no names retired for the 1956, 1958, and 1959 seasons. Collectively, these storms resulted in at least 2947 fatalities and over $2.04 billion in damage. The deadliest hurricane was Hurricane Hazel, which killed at least 1,191 people, while the costliest was Hurricane Diane, which caused US$831 million in damage.

| Name | Dates active | Peak classification | Sustained wind speeds | Pressure | Areas affected | Deaths | Damage (USD) | Refs |
|---|---|---|---|---|---|---|---|---|
| Carol | August 25 – September 1, 1954 | Category 3 hurricane | 115 mph (185 km/h) | 955 hPa (28.20 inHg) | Northeastern United States, Canada | 72 | $462 million | |
| Edna | September 5–11, 1954 | Category 3 hurricane | 125 mph (205 km/h) | 943 hPa (27.85 inHg) | New England, Atlantic Canada | 29 | $42 million | |
| Hazel | October 5–15, 1954 | Category 4 hurricane | 130 mph (215 km/h) | 938 hPa (27.70 inHg) | The Caribbean, Eastern United States, Canada | 1,191 | $382 million | |
| Connie | August 3–15, 1955 | Category 4 hurricane | 140 mph (220 km/h) | 944 hPa (27.88 inHg) | Mid-Atlantic states, New England | 77 | $86 million | |
| Diane | August 7–21, 1955 | Category 2 hurricane | 105 mph (165 km/h) | 969 hPa (28.61 inHg) | Mid-Atlantic states, New England | 184 | $831 million | |
| Ione | September 10–21, 1955 | Category 4 hurricane | 140 mph (220 km/h) | 938 hPa (27.70 inHg) | North Carolina | 7 | $88 million | |
| Janet | September 21–30, 1955 | Category 5 hurricane | 175 mph (280 km/h) | 914 hPa (26.99 inHg) | Lesser Antilles, Central America | 1,023 | $47.8 million | |
| Audrey | June 25–29, 1957 | Category 3 hurricane | 125 mph (205 km/h) | 946 hPa (27.94 inHg) | Southern United States | 416 | $150 million | |
| 8 names | References: (Note: References for the retired names.) (Note: Reference for dates, season, wind speeds and pressure.) | | | | | 2947 | $2.04 billion | |

=== 1960s ===
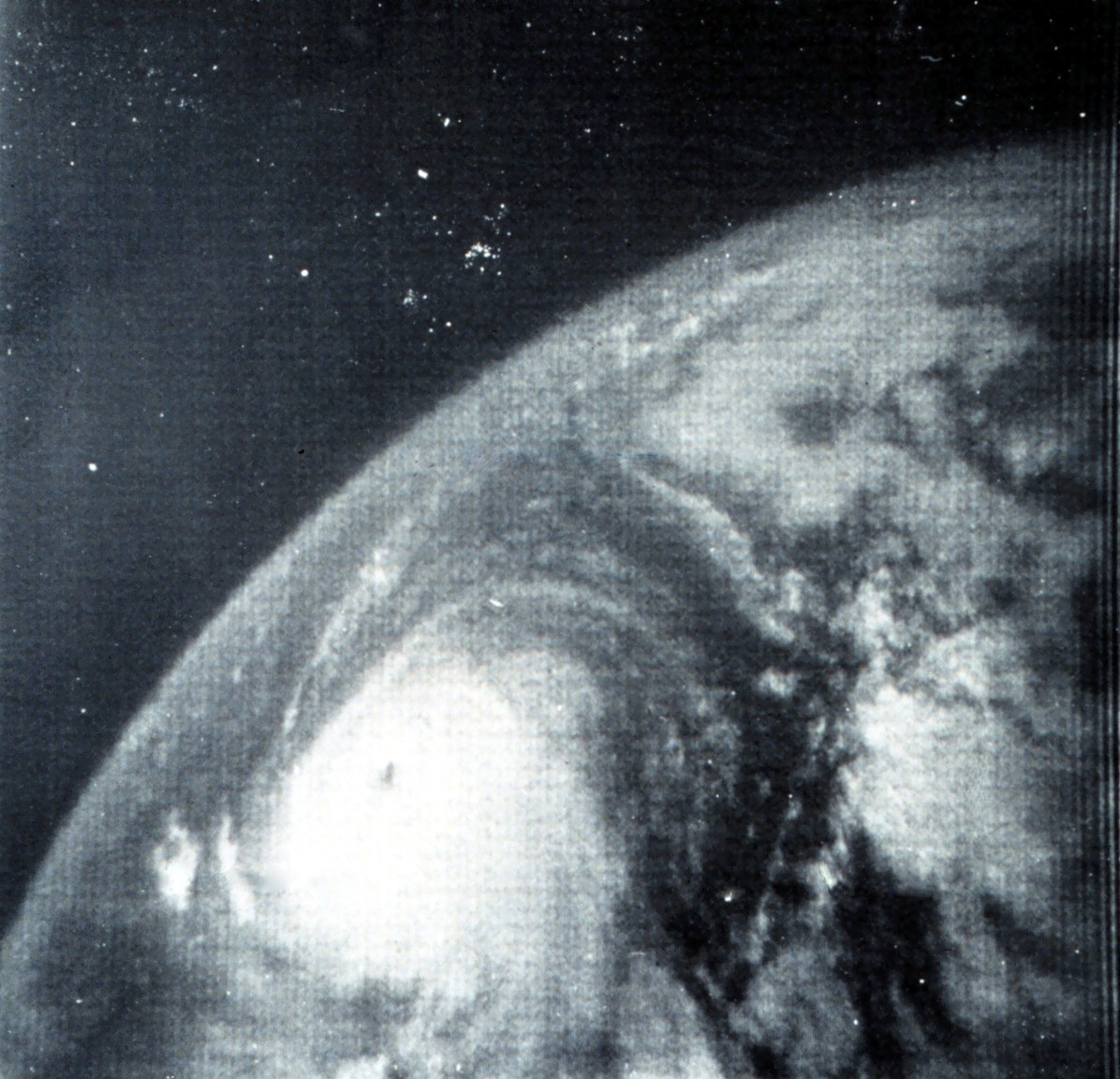
Hurricane Betsy was the first hurricane to have damages exceeding US$1 billion.

In 1960, four rotating lists of names were developed to avoid creating new lists each year, while the practice of retiring any particularly damaging storm names for 10 years continued, with 11 names deemed significant enough to be retired during the decade. At the 1969 Hurricane Warning Conference, the National Hurricane Center requested that Carol, Edna, Hazel, and Inez be permanently retired due to their importance to the research community. This request was subsequently accepted and led to today's practice of retiring names of significant tropical cyclones permanently. There were no names retired for the 1962 and 1968 seasons. Collectively, the 11 systems were responsible for at least 9841 fatalities and in excess of $6.13 billion in damage.

| Name | Dates active | Peak classification | Sustained wind speeds | Pressure | Areas affected | Deaths | Damage (USD) | Refs |
|---|---|---|---|---|---|---|---|---|
| Donna | August 29 – September 14, 1960 | Category 4 hurricane | 145 mph (230 km/h) | 930 hPa (27.46 inHg) | The Caribbean, Eastern United States | 364 | $900 million | |
| Carla | September 3–13, 1961 | Category 4 hurricane | 145 mph (230 km/h) | 927 hPa (27.37 inHg) | Texas, Louisiana; Midwestern United States | 46 | $408 million | |
| Hattie | October 27 – November 1, 1961 | Category 5 hurricane | 165 mph (270 km/h) | 914 hPa (26.99 inHg) | Central America | 319 | $60.3 million | |
| Flora | September 26 – October 12, 1963 | Category 4 hurricane | 150 mph (240 km/h) | 933 hPa (27.55 inHg) | The Caribbean | 7,193 | $529 million | |
| Cleo | August 20 – September 5, 1964 | Category 4 hurricane | 150 mph (240 km/h) | 938 hPa (27.70 inHg) | The Caribbean, Southeastern United States | 217 | $198 million | |
| Dora | August 28 – September 14, 1964 | Category 4 hurricane | 130 mph (215 km/h) | 942 hPa (27.82 inHg) | Southeastern United States | 5 | $250 million | |
| Hilda | September 28 – October 4, 1964 | Category 4 hurricane | 140 mph (220 km/h) | 941 hPa (27.79 inHg) | Southern United States | 38 | $125 million | |
| Betsy | August 27 – September 14, 1965 | Category 4 hurricane | 140 mph (220 km/h) | 942 hPa (27.82 inHg) | Bahamas, Southeastern United States | 75 | $1.4 billion | |
| Inez | September 21 – October 11, 1966 | Category 5 hurricane | 165 mph (270 km/h) | 927 hPa (27.37 inHg) | The Caribbean, Florida, Mexico | 1,269 | $616 million | |
| Beulah | September 5–22, 1967 | Category 5 hurricane | 160 mph (260 km/h) | 921 hPa (27.20 inHg) | The Caribbean, Mexico, Texas | 59 | $208 million | |
| Camille | August 14–22, 1969 | Category 5 hurricane | 175 mph (280 km/h) | 900 hPa (26.58 inHg) | Cuba, Southeastern United States | 301 | $1.43 billion | |
| 11 names | References: | | | | | 9886 | $6.14 billion | |

=== 1970s ===
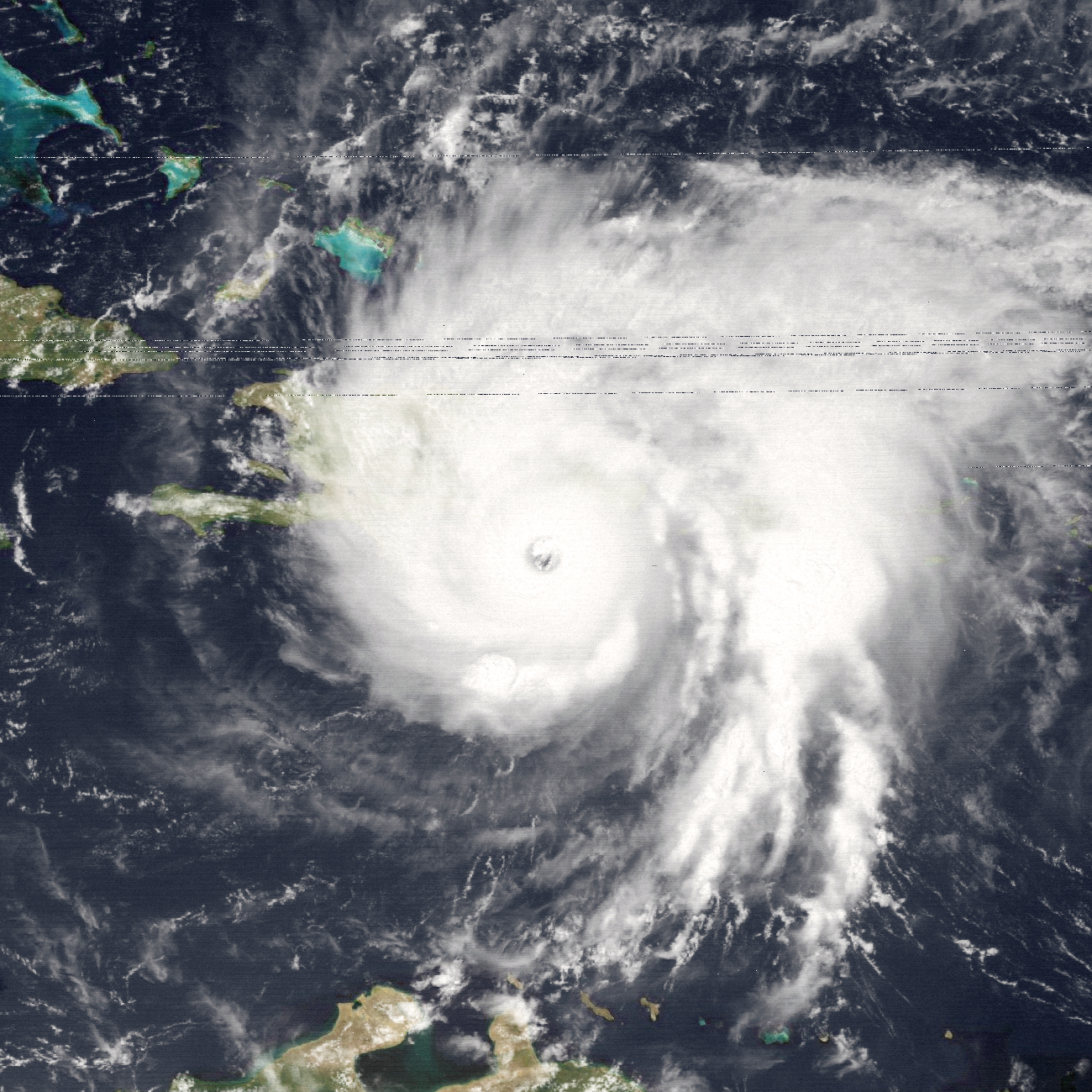
Hurricane David at its peak intensity.

Starting in 1979, the WMO began assigning both male and female names to tropical cyclones. This decade featured hurricanes David and Frederic, the first male Atlantic hurricane names to be retired. During this decade, 9 storms were deemed significant enough to have their names retired. Together these 9 systems caused at least $9.41 billion in damage, while at least 10527 people lost their lives. No names were retired for the 1971, 1973, and 1976 seasons.

| Name | Dates active | Peak classification | Sustained wind speeds | Pressure | Areas affected | Deaths | Damage (USD) | Refs |
|---|---|---|---|---|---|---|---|---|
| Celia | July 31 – August 5, 1970 | Category 4 hurricane | 140 mph (220 km/h) | 944 hPa (27.88 inHg) | Cuba, United States Gulf Coast | 20 | $930 million | |
| Agnes | June 14–23, 1972 | Category 1 hurricane | 80 mph (130 km/h) | 979 hPa (28.91 inHg) | Mexico, Cuba, Eastern United States | 124 | $2.1 billion | |
| Carmen | August 29 – September 10, 1974 | Category 4 hurricane | 155 mph (250 km/h) | 928 hPa (27.40 inHg) | Central America, Mexico; United States Gulf Coast | 8 | $162 million | |
| Fifi | September 14–24, 1974 | Category 2 hurricane | 100 mph (155 km/h) | 970 hPa (28.64 inHg) | Jamaica, Central America, Mexico | 8,200 | $1.8 billion | |
| Eloise | September 13–24, 1975 | Category 3 hurricane | 125 mph (205 km/h) | 950 hPa (28.05 inHg) | The Caribbean, Yucatán Peninsula, Florida | 80 | $550 million | |
| Anita | August 29 – September 4, 1977 | Category 5 hurricane | 175 mph (280 km/h) | 926 hPa (27.34 inHg) | Mexico | 11 | Unknown | |
| Greta | September 13–23, 1978 | Category 4 hurricane | 130 mph (215 km/h) | 947 hPa (27.96 inHg) | The Caribbean, Central America, Mexico | 5 | $26 million | |
| David | August 25 – September 8, 1979 | Category 5 hurricane | 175 mph (280 km/h) | 924 hPa (27.29 inHg) | The Caribbean, United States East coast | 2,068 | $1.54 billion | |
| Frederic | August 29 – September 15, 1979 | Category 4 hurricane | 130 mph (215 km/h) | 943 hPa (27.85 inHg) | The Caribbean, Southeastern United States | 12 | $1.7 billion | |
| 9 names | References: | | | | | >10,527 | $10.3 billion | |

=== 1980s ===
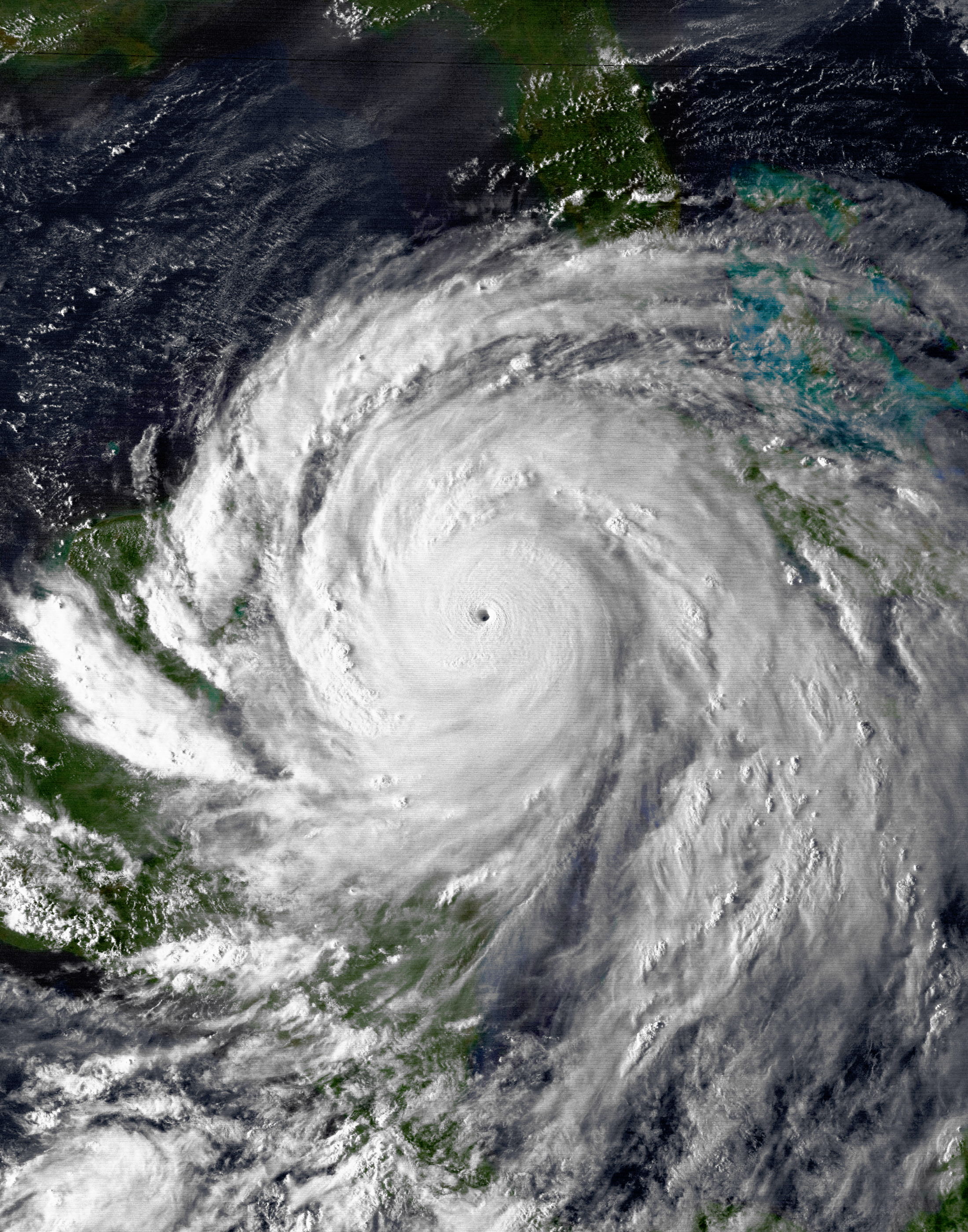
Hurricane Gilbert near its peak intensity.

After control of the naming of hurricanes was turned over to the WMO's Hurricane Committee during the mid-1970s, the 1980s marked the least prolific decade regarding the number of retired storms, with 7 names warranting removal. Between them the 7 systems caused over $23.1 billion in damage while over 891 people lost their lives. Hurricane Gilbert was the most intense tropical cyclone during the decade by pressure, with a minimum value of 888 hPa (26.22 inHg). This was the lowest recorded pressure in a North Atlantic hurricane until Hurricane Wilma surpassed it in 2005. In addition, Hurricane Allen was the most intense tropical cyclone during the decade by wind speed, with maximum 1–minute sustained winds of 190 mph (305 km/h). This remains tied for the highest sustained wind speed of any Atlantic hurricane on record. There were no names retired for 1981, 1982, 1984, 1986, and 1987 seasons, which was the most of any decade since the introduction of the practice of retiring hurricane names.

| Name | Dates active | Peak classification | Sustained wind speeds | Pressure | Areas affected | Deaths | Damage (USD) | Refs |
|---|---|---|---|---|---|---|---|---|
| Allen | July 31 – August 11, 1980 | Category 5 hurricane | 190 mph (305 km/h) | 899 hPa (26.55 inHg) | The Caribbean, Yucatán Peninsula, Mexico, South Texas | 269 | $1.57 billion | |
| Alicia | August 15–21, 1983 | Category 3 hurricane | 115 mph (185 km/h) | 963 hPa (28.44 inHg) | Eastern Texas, Louisiana | 21 | $3 billion | |
| Elena | August 28 – September 4, 1985 | Category 3 hurricane | 125 mph (205 km/h) | 953 hPa (28.14 inHg) | Cuba, United States Gulf Coast | 9 | $1.3 billion | |
| Gloria | September 16 – October 2, 1985 | Category 4 hurricane | 145 mph (230 km/h) | 919 hPa (27.14 inHg) | United States East Coast, Atlantic Canada | 14 | $900 million | |
| Gilbert | September 8–19, 1988 | Category 5 hurricane | 185 mph (295 km/h) | 888 hPa (26.22 inHg) | Jamaica, Venezuela, Central America, Hispaniola, Mexico | 318 | $2.98 billion | |
| Joan | October 11 – November 2, 1988 | Category 4 hurricane | 145 mph (230 km/h) | 932 hPa (27.52 inHg) | Lesser Antilles, Colombia, Venezuela, Central America | 216 | $2 billion | |
| Hugo | September 9–25, 1989 | Category 5 hurricane | 160 mph (260 km/h) | 918 hPa (27.11 inHg) | The Caribbean, United States East Coast | 107 | $11 billion | |
| 7 names | References: | | | | | 891 | $20.4 billion | |

=== 1990s ===
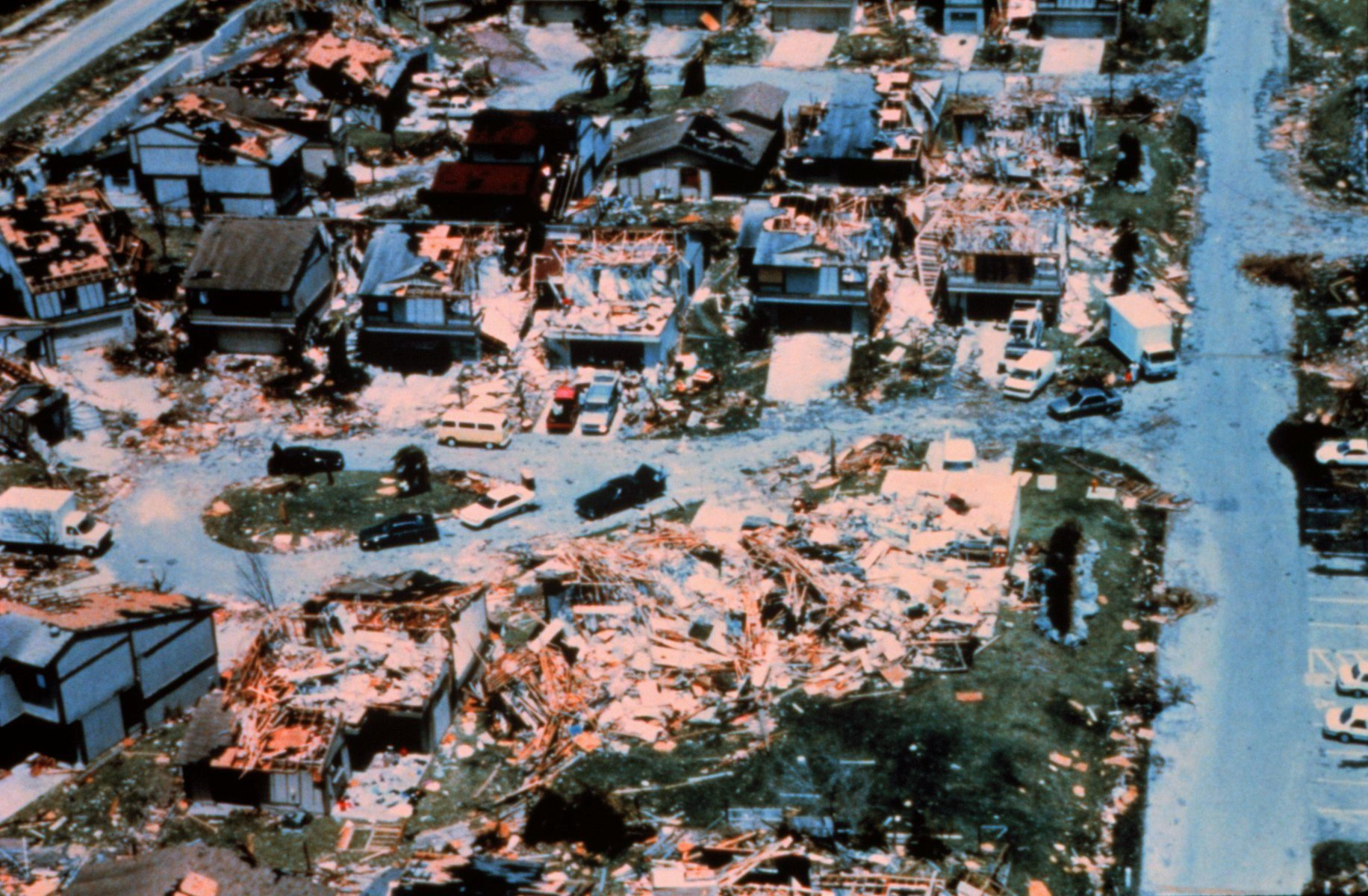
Damage after Hurricane Andrew in Miami.

During the 1990s, the Atlantic Ocean moved into its active era, which led to more tropical cyclones forming during the hurricane seasons. The decade featured Hurricane Andrew, which at the time was the costliest hurricane on record, and also Hurricane Mitch, which is considered to be the deadliest tropical cyclone to have its name retired, killing over 11,000 people in Central America. A total of 15 names were retired in this decade, seven during the 1995 and 1996 seasons. Cumulatively, the 15 systems caused over $68 billion in damage while over 20470 people lost their lives. No names were retired for the 1993, 1994, and 1997 seasons.

| Name | Dates active | Peak classification | Sustained wind speeds | Pressure | Areas affected | Deaths | Damage (USD) | Refs |
|---|---|---|---|---|---|---|---|---|
| Diana | August 4–9, 1990 | Category 2 hurricane | 100 mph (155 km/h) | 980 hPa (28.94 inHg) | Yucatán Peninsula, Central Mexico | 139 | $90 million | |
| Klaus | October 3–9, 1990 | Category 1 hurricane | 80 mph (130 km/h) | 985 hPa (29.09 inHg) | Lesser Antilles, The Bahamas, Southeast United States | 11 | $1 million | |
| Bob | August 16–20, 1991 | Category 3 hurricane | 115 mph (185 km/h) | 950 hPa (28.05 inHg) | United States East Coast, Canada | 17 | $1.5 billion | |
| Andrew | August 16–28, 1992 | Category 5 hurricane | 175 mph (280 km/h) | 922 hPa (27.23 inHg) | The Bahamas, Florida, United States Gulf Coast | 65 | $27 billion | |
| Luis | August 27 – September 11, 1995 | Category 4 hurricane | 150 mph (240 km/h) | 935 hPa (27.61 inHg) | Leeward Islands, Puerto Rico, Bermuda | 19 | $3.3 billion | |
| Marilyn | September 12–22, 1995 | Category 3 hurricane | 115 mph (185 km/h) | 949 hPa (28.02 inHg) | The Caribbean, Bermuda | 13 | $2.5 billion | |
| Opal | September 27 – October 6, 1995 | Category 4 hurricane | 150 mph (240 km/h) | 916 hPa (27.05 inHg) | Guatemala, Yucatán Peninsula, Eastern United States | 63 | $4.7 billion | |
| Roxanne | October 7–21, 1995 | Category 3 hurricane | 115 mph (185 km/h) | 956 hPa (28.23 inHg) | Mexico | 29 | $1.5 billion | |
| Cesar | July 24–29, 1996 | Category 1 hurricane | 85 mph (140 km/h) | 985 hPa (29.09 inHg) | Central America, Mexico | 111 | $203 million | |
| Fran | August 23 – September 8, 1996 | Category 3 hurricane | 120 mph (195 km/h) | 946 hPa (27.94 inHg) | Eastern United States | 27 | $5 billion | |
| Hortense | September 3–16, 1996 | Category 4 hurricane | 140 mph (220 km/h) | 935 hPa (27.61 inHg) | The Caribbean, Puerto Rico, Atlantic Canada | 39 | $158 million | |
| Georges | September 15 – October 1, 1998 | Category 4 hurricane | 155 mph (250 km/h) | 937 hPa (27.67 inHg) | The Caribbean, United States Gulf Coast | 604 | $9.37 billion | |
| Mitch | October 22 – November 5, 1998 | Category 5 hurricane | 180 mph (285 km/h) | 905 hPa (26.72 inHg) | Central America, Yucatán Peninsula, South Florida | 11,374 | $6.08 billion | |
| Floyd | September 7–19, 1999 | Category 4 hurricane | 155 mph (250 km/h) | 921 hPa (27.20 inHg) | The Bahamas, Eastern United States, Atlantic Canada | 85 | $6.5 billion | |
| Lenny | November 13–23, 1999 | Category 4 hurricane | 155 mph (250 km/h) | 933 hPa (27.55 inHg) | Colombia, Puerto Rico, Leeward Islands | 17 | $686 million | |
| 15 names | References: | | | | | >20,470 | $68 billion | |

=== 2000s ===
Radar loop of Hurricane Katrina making landfall in Louisiana on August 29, 2005.

After the Atlantic basin had moved into the warm phase of the Atlantic multidecadal oscillation during the mid-1990s, the 2000s marked the most prolific decade in terms of the number of retired storms, with 24 names warranting removal. The decade featured one of the costliest tropical cyclones on record, Hurricane Katrina, which inflicted roughly US$125 billion in damage across the Gulf Coast of the United States. Katrina was also the deadliest hurricane to strike the United States since the 1928 Okeechobee hurricane. After stalling over and flooding southeastern Texas, and causing approximately US$9 billion in damage, Tropical Storm Allison became the first tropical storm in this basin to have its name retired, while subtropical storms started to be named during 2002. Hurricane Jeanne was the deadliest storm during the decade and was responsible for over 3,000 deaths, when it impacted Haiti and other parts of the Caribbean as a tropical storm and minimal hurricane. During October 2005, Hurricane Wilma became the most intense tropical cyclone in the Atlantic basin on record, with a central pressure of 882 hPa (26.05 inHg). There were no names retired for the 2006 and 2009 seasons. Collectively, the 24 systems were responsible for nearly 7,900 fatalities and in excess of US$300 billion in damage.

| Name | Dates active | Peak classification | Sustained wind speeds | Pressure | Areas affected | Deaths | Damage (USD) | Refs |
|---|---|---|---|---|---|---|---|---|
| Keith | September 28 – October 6, 2000 | Category 4 hurricane | 140 mph (220 km/h) | 939 hPa (27.73 inHg) | Central America | 68 | $32 million | |
| Allison | June 4–18, 2001 | Tropical storm | 60 mph (95 km/h) | 1000 hPa (29.53 inHg) | Texas, Louisiana, Southern United States | 55 | $8.5 billion | |
| Iris | October 4–9, 2001 | Category 4 hurricane | 145 mph (230 km/h) | 948 hPa (27.99 inHg) | Hispaniola, Jamaica, Belize, Guatemala, Mexico | 36 | $25 million | |
| Michelle | October 29 – November 6, 2001 | Category 4 hurricane | 140 mph (220 km/h) | 933 hPa (27.55 inHg) | Central America, Jamaica, Cuba, Bahamas | 48 | $2 billion | |
| Isidore | September 14–27, 2002 | Category 3 hurricane | 125 mph (205 km/h) | 934 hPa (27.58 inHg) | Cuba, Yucatán Peninsula, Louisiana | 22 | $1.2 billion | |
| Lili | September 21 – October 4, 2002 | Category 4 hurricane | 145 mph (230 km/h) | 938 hPa (27.70 inHg) | Windward Islands, Cuba, Jamaica, Haiti, Louisiana | 15 | $1.1 billion | |
| Fabian | August 25 – September 8, 2003 | Category 4 hurricane | 145 mph (230 km/h) | 939 hPa (27.73 inHg) | Bermuda | 8 | $300 million | |
| Isabel | September 6–20, 2003 | Category 5 hurricane | 165 mph (270 km/h) | 915 hPa (27.02 inHg) | Greater Antilles, Bahamas, Eastern United States, Ontario | 51 | $5.5 billion | |
| Juan | September 24–29, 2003 | Category 2 hurricane | 105 mph (165 km/h) | 969 hPa (28.61 inHg) | Atlantic Canada | 8 | $200 million | |
| Charley | August 9–15, 2004 | Category 4 hurricane | 150 mph (240 km/h) | 941 hPa (27.79 inHg) | Jamaica, Cayman Islands, Cuba, Florida, The Carolinas | 35 | $16.9 billion | |
| Frances | August 24 – September 10, 2004 | Category 4 hurricane | 145 mph (230 km/h) | 935 hPa (27.61 inHg) | Caribbean, Eastern United States, Ontario | 50 | $9.8 billion | |
| Ivan | September 2–24, 2004 | Category 5 hurricane | 165 mph (270 km/h) | 910 hPa (26.87 inHg) | Caribbean, Venezuela, United States Gulf Coast | 124 | $20.5 billion | |
| Jeanne | September 13–28, 2004 | Category 3 hurricane | 120 mph (195 km/h) | 950 hPa (28.05 inHg) | Caribbean, Eastern United States | 3,037 | $7.94 billion | |
| Dennis | July 4–13, 2005 | Category 4 hurricane | 150 mph (240 km/h) | 930 hPa (27.46 inHg) | Greater Antilles, Southeastern United States | 88 | $4 billion | |
| Katrina | August 23–30, 2005 | Category 5 hurricane | 175 mph (280 km/h) | 902 hPa (26.64 inHg) | Bahamas, United States Gulf Coast | 1,392 | $125 billion | |
| Rita | September 18–26, 2005 | Category 5 hurricane | 180 mph (285 km/h) | 895 hPa (26.43 inHg) | Cuba, United States Gulf Coast | 120 | $18.5 billion | |
| Stan | October 1–5, 2005 | Category 1 hurricane | 80 mph (130 km/h) | 977 hPa (28.85 inHg) | Mexico, Central America | 1,673 | $4 billion | |
| Wilma | October 15–26, 2005 | Category 5 hurricane | 185 mph (295 km/h) | 882 hPa (26.05 inHg) | Greater Antilles, Central America, Yucatán Peninsula, Florida | 52 | $27.4 billion | |
| Dean | August 13–23, 2007 | Category 5 hurricane | 175 mph (280 km/h) | 905 hPa (26.72 inHg) | Caribbean, Central America | 45 | $1.8 billion | |
| Felix | August 31 – September 5, 2007 | Category 5 hurricane | 175 mph (280 km/h) | 929 hPa (27.43 inHg) | Nicaragua, Honduras | 133 | $720 million | |
| Noel | October 28 – November 2, 2007 | Category 1 hurricane | 80 mph (130 km/h) | 980 hPa (28.94 inHg) | Greater Antilles, Eastern United States, Atlantic Canada | 223 | $580 million | |
| Gustav | August 25 – September 4, 2008 | Category 4 hurricane | 155 mph (250 km/h) | 941 hPa (27.79 inHg) | Greater Antilles, Cayman Islands, United States Gulf Coast | 153 | $8.3 billion | |
| Ike | September 1–14, 2008 | Category 4 hurricane | 145 mph (230 km/h) | 935 hPa (27.61 inHg) | Greater Antilles, Texas, Louisiana, Midwestern United States | 214 | $38 billion | |
| Paloma | November 5–10, 2008 | Category 4 hurricane | 145 mph (230 km/h) | 944 hPa (27.88 inHg) | Cayman Islands, Cuba | 1 | $450 million | |
| 24 names | References: | | | | | 7,875 | $309 billion | |

=== 2010s ===
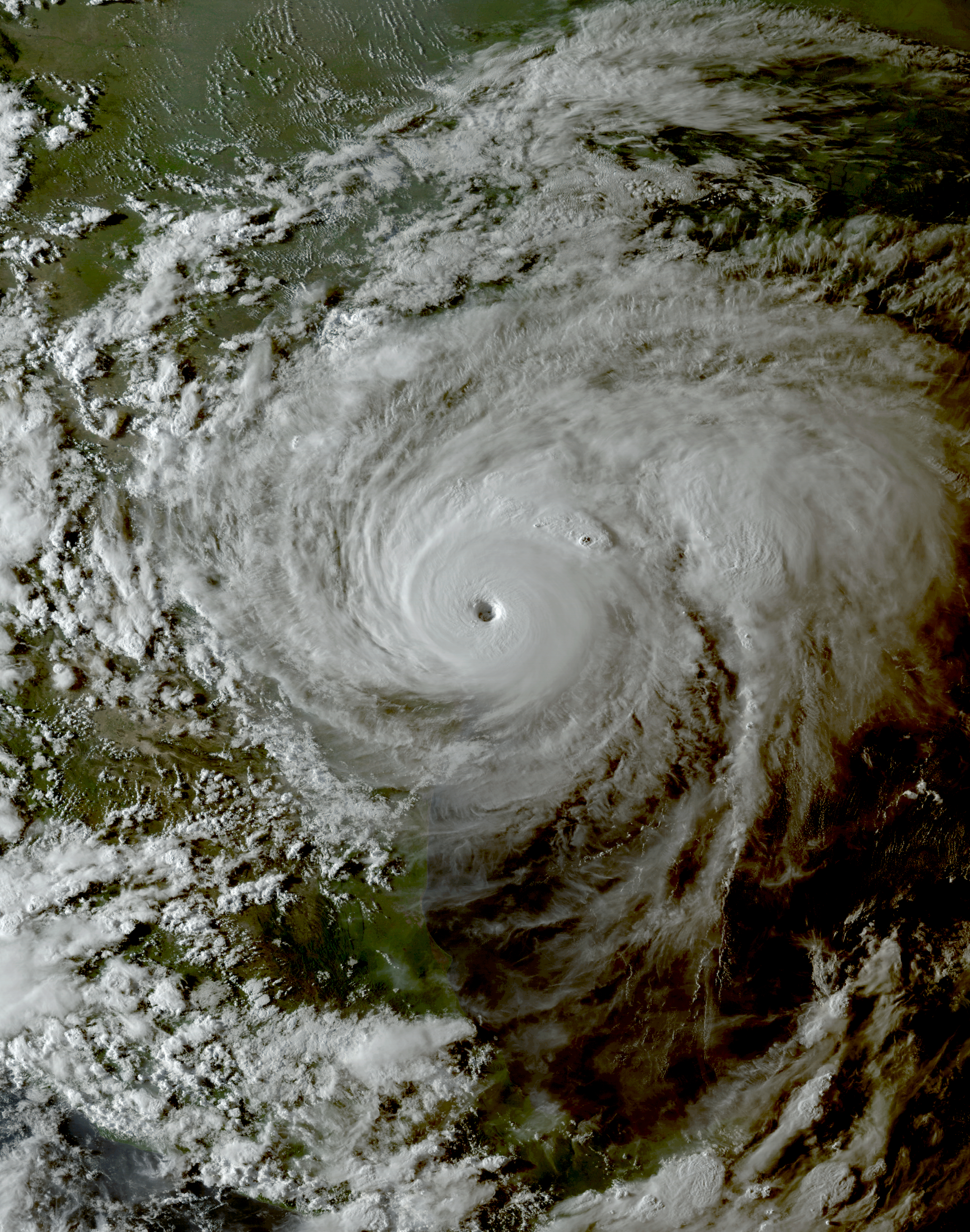
Hurricane Harvey hours before landfall in Texas on August 25, 2017

Some of the most devastating hurricanes to hit the United States in recorded history did so in the 2010s, a decade in which 30 named storms were classified as major hurricanes (out of 152 named storms). Altogether, 16 tropical cyclone names were retired during the 2010s. Collectively, these systems killed at least 4779 people and caused at least $450 billion worth of damage. Among them, Hurricane Maria was the most intense tropical cyclone by pressure, with a minimum value of 908 hPa (26.81 inHg), as well as the deadliest, with 3,057 fatalities directly or indirectly caused by Maria. Hurricane Dorian was the most intense in terms of wind speed, with maximum sustained winds of 185 mph (295 km/h). Hurricane Harvey was the decade's costliest system, as well as the costliest overall, tied with 2005's Katrina. There were no names retired for the 2014 season.

| Name | Dates active | Peak classification | Sustained wind speeds | Pressure | Areas affected | Deaths | Damage (USD) | Refs |
|---|---|---|---|---|---|---|---|---|
| Igor | September 8–21, 2010 | Category 4 hurricane | 155 mph (250 km/h) | 924 hPa (27.29 inHg) | Bermuda, Newfoundland | 4 | $200 million | |
| Tomas | October 29 – November 7, 2010 | Category 2 hurricane | 100 mph (155 km/h) | 982 hPa (29.00 inHg) | Caribbean | 44 | $348 million | |
| Irene | August 21–28, 2011 | Category 3 hurricane | 120 mph (195 km/h) | 942 hPa (27.82 inHg) | Caribbean, Bahamas, United States East Coast, Eastern Canada | 58 | $14.2 billion | |
| Sandy | October 22–29, 2012 | Category 3 hurricane | 115 mph (185 km/h) | 940 hPa (27.76 inHg) | Caribbean, Bahamas, United States East Coast, Eastern Canada | 254 | $68.7 billion | |
| Ingrid | September 12–17, 2013 | Category 1 hurricane | 85 mph (140 km/h) | 983 hPa (29.03 inHg) | Mexico | 32 | $1.5 billion | |
| Erika | August 24–28, 2015 | Tropical storm | 50 mph (85 km/h) | 1001 hPa (29.56 inHg) | Lesser Antilles, Hispaniola | 35 | $511 million | |
| Joaquin | September 28 – October 8, 2015 | Category 4 hurricane | 155 mph (250 km/h) | 931 hPa (27.49 inHg) | Bahamas, Bermuda | 34 | $200 million | |
| Matthew | September 28 – October 9, 2016 | Category 5 hurricane | 165 mph (270 km/h) | 934 hPa (27.58 inHg) | Caribbean, Southeastern United States | 731 | $15.1 billion | |
| Otto | November 20–26, 2016 | Category 3 hurricane | 115 mph (185 km/h) | 975 hPa (28.79 inHg) | Panama, Costa Rica, Nicaragua | 23 | $192 million | |
| Harvey | August 17 – September 1, 2017 | Category 4 hurricane | 130 mph (215 km/h) | 937 hPa (27.67 inHg) | Texas, Louisiana | 107 | $125 billion | |
| Irma | August 30 – September 12, 2017 | Category 5 hurricane | 180 mph (285 km/h) | 914 hPa (26.99 inHg) | Caribbean, Southeastern United States | 134 | $77.2 billion | |
| Maria | September 16–30, 2017 | Category 5 hurricane | 175 mph (280 km/h) | 908 hPa (26.81 inHg) | Lesser Antilles, Puerto Rico | 3,059 | $91.4 billion | |
| Nate | October 4–9, 2017 | Category 1 hurricane | 90 mph (150 km/h) | 981 hPa (28.97 inHg) | Central America, United States Gulf Coast | 48 | $787 million | |
| Florence | August 31 – September 17, 2018 | Category 4 hurricane | 150 mph (240 km/h) | 937 hPa (27.67 inHg) | Eastern United States | 57 | $24 billion | |
| Michael | October 7–11, 2018 | Category 5 hurricane | 160 mph (260 km/h) | 919 hPa (27.14 inHg) | Central America, United States Gulf Coast | 74 | $25 billion | |
| Dorian | August 24 – September 7, 2019 | Category 5 hurricane | 185 mph (295 km/h) | 910 hPa (26.87 inHg) | Bahamas, Southeastern United States, Eastern Canada | 84 | $5.1 billion | |
| 16 names | References: | | | | | 4,630 | $453 billion | |

=== 2020s ===
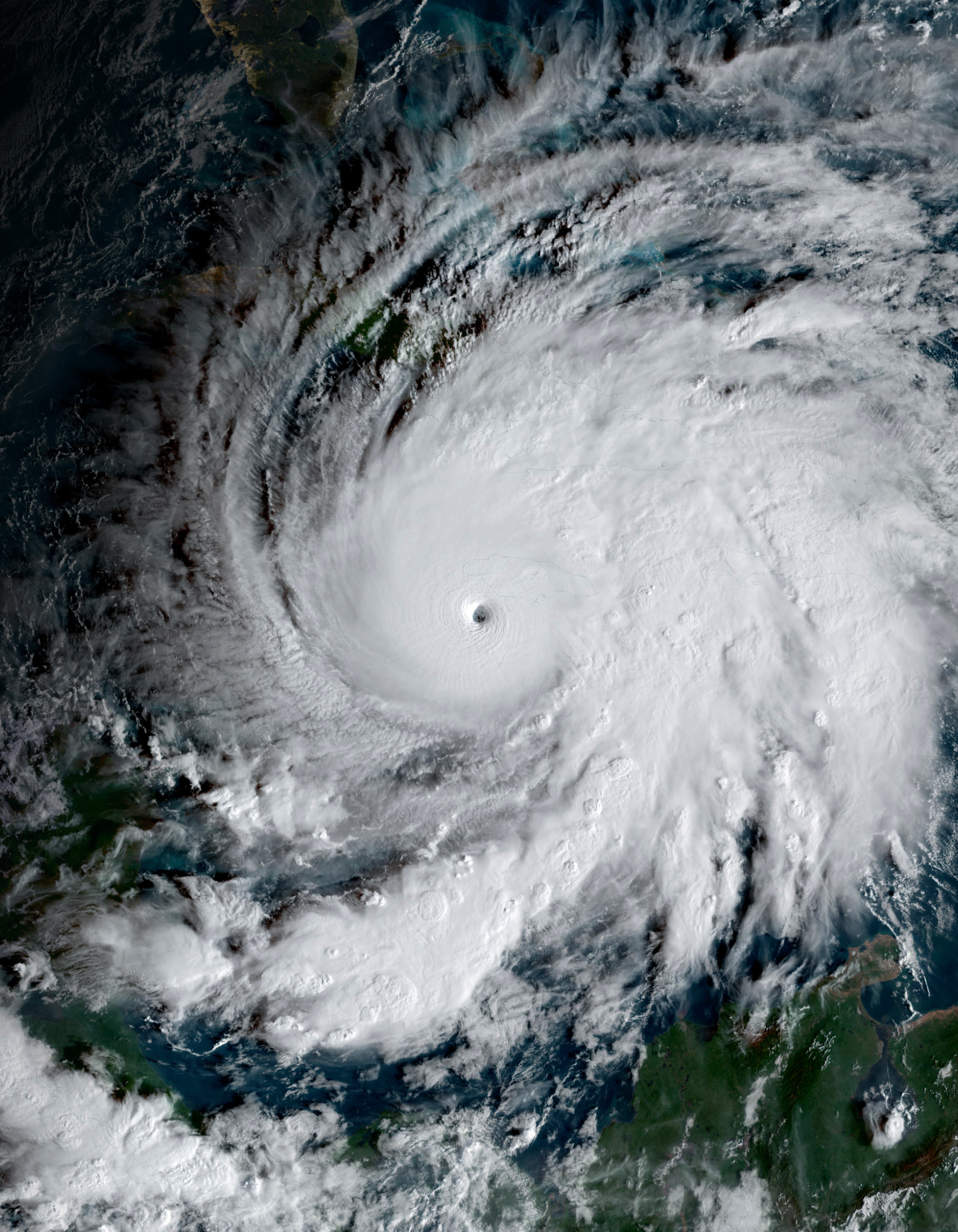
Hurricane Melissa at its record peak intensity just prior to landfall in Jamaica on October 28, 2025

Ten tropical cyclone names have been retired so far in the 2020s. Hurricane Laura was the costliest hurricane of the 2020 season, causing over $23 billion in damages, much of which occurred along the southwestern Louisiana coast as a result of its 18 ft (5.5 m) storm surge. Hurricanes Eta and Iota both made landfall in Nicaragua, with Iota doing so with maximum sustained winds near 145 mph (233 km/h). Each brought torrential rain and then flooding to much of Central America. Hurricane Ida made landfall in southeastern Louisiana with sustained winds of 150 mph (240 km/h); the costliest hurricane of the 2021 season, Ida caused $75 billion damage and directly caused 55 deaths from the southeastern United States to New England. Hurricane Fiona caused major devastation to the islands in the Caribbean Sea and was the most intense storm by barometric pressure to strike Atlantic Canada. Hurricane Ian was the third-costliest tropical cyclone on record, only behind hurricanes Katrina and Harvey in 2005 and 2017, respectively. Ian made landfall in western Florida and devastated the state before losing hurricane strength. Thereafter, Ian entered the Atlantic Ocean, intensifying to Category 1 strength, and hit the coast of South Carolina. Hurricane Beryl was the earliest Category 5 hurricane in the Atlantic on record, beating the record set by Emily in 2005 by more than two weeks, and proceeded to devastate the island of Grenada, before later hitting the state of Texas and causing significant damage. After making landfall in the Big Bend Region of Florida, Hurricane Helene caused catastrophic flooding and killed hundreds in the southeastern United States. Hurricane Milton formed 10 days later and within 48 hours, it became the most intense hurricane in the Gulf of Mexico for the 2024 season, with its central pressure tying for fifth place with Rita of 2005. After weakening, Milton struck Florida, causing a prolific tornado outbreak in the state that was aided by a dip of the jet stream, as well as causing major damage across the central part of the state. Hurricane Melissa became the strongest Atlantic hurricane on record by wind speed tied with Allen of 1980, before making a catastrophic landfall in Jamaica as one of the most intense landfalls in the Atlantic. There were no names retired for the 2023 season.

| Name | Dates active | Peak classification | Sustained wind speeds | Pressure | Areas affected | Deaths | Damage (USD) | Refs |
|---|---|---|---|---|---|---|---|---|
| Laura | August 20–29, 2020 | Category 4 hurricane | 150 mph (240 km/h) | 937 hPa (27.67 inHg) | Caribbean, Louisiana, Texas | 81 | $23.3 billion | |
| Eta | October 31 – November 13, 2020 | Category 4 hurricane | 150 mph (240 km/h) | 922 hPa (27.23 inHg) | Central America, Cuba, Southeastern United States | 189 | $7.24 billion | |
| Iota | November 13–18, 2020 | Category 4 hurricane | 155 mph (250 km/h) | 917 hPa (27.08 inHg) | Central America | 84 | $1.4 billion | |
| Ida | August 26 – September 5, 2021 | Category 4 hurricane | 150 mph (240 km/h) | 929 hPa (27.43 inHg) | Cuba, United States Gulf Coast, Northeastern United States | 112 | $75.3 billion | |
| Fiona | September 14–23, 2022 | Category 4 hurricane | 140 mph (220 km/h) | 931 hPa (27.49 inHg) | Caribbean, Eastern Canada | 29 | $3.09 billion | |
| Ian | September 23–30, 2022 | Category 5 hurricane | 160 mph (260 km/h) | 937 hPa (27.67 inHg) | Cuba, Florida, The Carolinas | 161 | $113 billion | |
| Beryl | June 28 – July 9, 2024 | Category 5 hurricane | 165 mph (270 km/h) | 932 hPa (27.52 inHg) | Caribbean, Yucatán Peninsula, Texas | 74 | $8.3 billion | |
| Helene | September 24–27, 2024 | Category 4 hurricane | 140 mph (220 km/h) | 939 hPa (27.73 inHg) | Yucatán Peninsula, Cuba, Southeastern United States | 252 | $78.7 billion | |
| Milton | October 5–10, 2024 | Category 5 hurricane | 180 mph (285 km/h) | 895 hPa (26.43 inHg) | Yucatán Peninsula, Florida | 45 | $34.3 billion | |
| Melissa | October 21–31, 2025 | Category 5 hurricane | 190 mph (305 km/h) | 892 hPa (26.34 inHg) | Greater Antilles, Bahamas | 95 | $8.83 billion | |
| 10 names | References: | | | | | 1,119 | $353.45 billion | |

== Retired names by letter ==
| Letter | Number of retired names | Retired names | Most recent addition |
|---|---|---|---|
| A | 7 | Agnes, Alicia, Allen, Allison, Andrew, Anita, Audrey | 2001 (Allison) |
| B | 4 | Beryl, Betsy, Beulah, Bob | 2024 (Beryl) |
| C | 9 | Camille, Carla, Carmen, Carol, Celia, Cesar, Charley, Cleo, Connie | 2004 (Charley) |
| D | 8 | David, Dean, Dennis, Diana, Diane, Donna, Dora, Dorian | 2019 (Dorian) |
| E | 4 | Edna, Elena, Eloise, Erika | 2015 (Erika) |
| F | 10 | Fabian, Felix, Fifi, Fiona, Flora, Florence, Floyd, Fran, Frances, Frederic | 2022 (Fiona) |
| G | 5 | Georges, Gilbert, Gloria, Greta, Gustav | 2008 (Gustav) |
| H | 7 | Harvey, Hattie, Hazel, Helene, Hilda, Hortense, Hugo | 2024 (Helene) |
| I | 13 | Ian, Ida, Igor, Ike, Inez, Ingrid, Ione, Irene, Iris, Irma, Isabel, Isidore, Ivan | 2022 (Ian) |
| J | 5 | Janet, Jeanne, Joan, Joaquin, Juan | 2015 (Joaquin) |
| K | 3 | Katrina, Keith, Klaus | 2005 (Katrina) |
| L | 4 | Laura, Lenny, Lili, Luis | 2020 (Laura) |
| M | 8 | Maria, Marilyn, Matthew, Melissa, Michael, Michelle, Milton, Mitch | 2025 (Melissa) |
| N | 2 | Nate, Noel | 2017 (Nate) |
| O | 2 | Opal, Otto | 2016 (Otto) |
| P | 1 | Paloma | 2008 |
| R | 2 | Rita, Roxanne | 2005 (Rita) |
| S | 2 | Sandy, Stan | 2012 (Sandy) |
| T | 1 | Tomas | 2010 |
| V | 0 | N/A | N/A |
| W | 1 | Wilma | 2005 |
| Greek alphabet | 2 | Eta, Iota | 2020 (Iota) |

== See also ==
- Lists of Atlantic hurricanes
- List of historical tropical cyclone names
- List of retired Pacific hurricane names
- List of retired Pacific typhoon names
- List of retired Philippine typhoon names
- List of retired Australian region cyclone names
- List of retired South Pacific cyclone names
