= List of storms named Ethel =

The name Ethel has been used to name five tropical cyclones worldwide, three times in the Atlantic Ocean, plus once each in the Australian region of the South Pacific Ocean and in the South-West Indian Ocean.

In the Atlantic:

- Tropical Storm Ethel (1956) – formed near the Bahamas and moved out to sea.
- Hurricane Ethel (1960) – a Category 3 hurricane that weakened to a tropical storm prior to making landfall in Pascagoula, Mississippi.
- Hurricane Ethel (1964) – a Category 2 hurricane that passed to the northeast of Bermuda.

The name, Ethel was dropped in the Atlantic basin following the 1964 season, and was replaced by Edna for the 1968 season.

In the Australian region:

- Cyclone Ethel (1996) – twice transited Cape York Peninsula before making a final landfall along the southern coast of the Gulf of Carpentaria, in the Northern Territory.

In the South-West Indian:

- Tropical Storm Ethel (2012) – a Category 1 equivalent cyclone that passed near Rodrigues.
