= Hurricane Edna =

Category 3 Atlantic hurricane in 1954

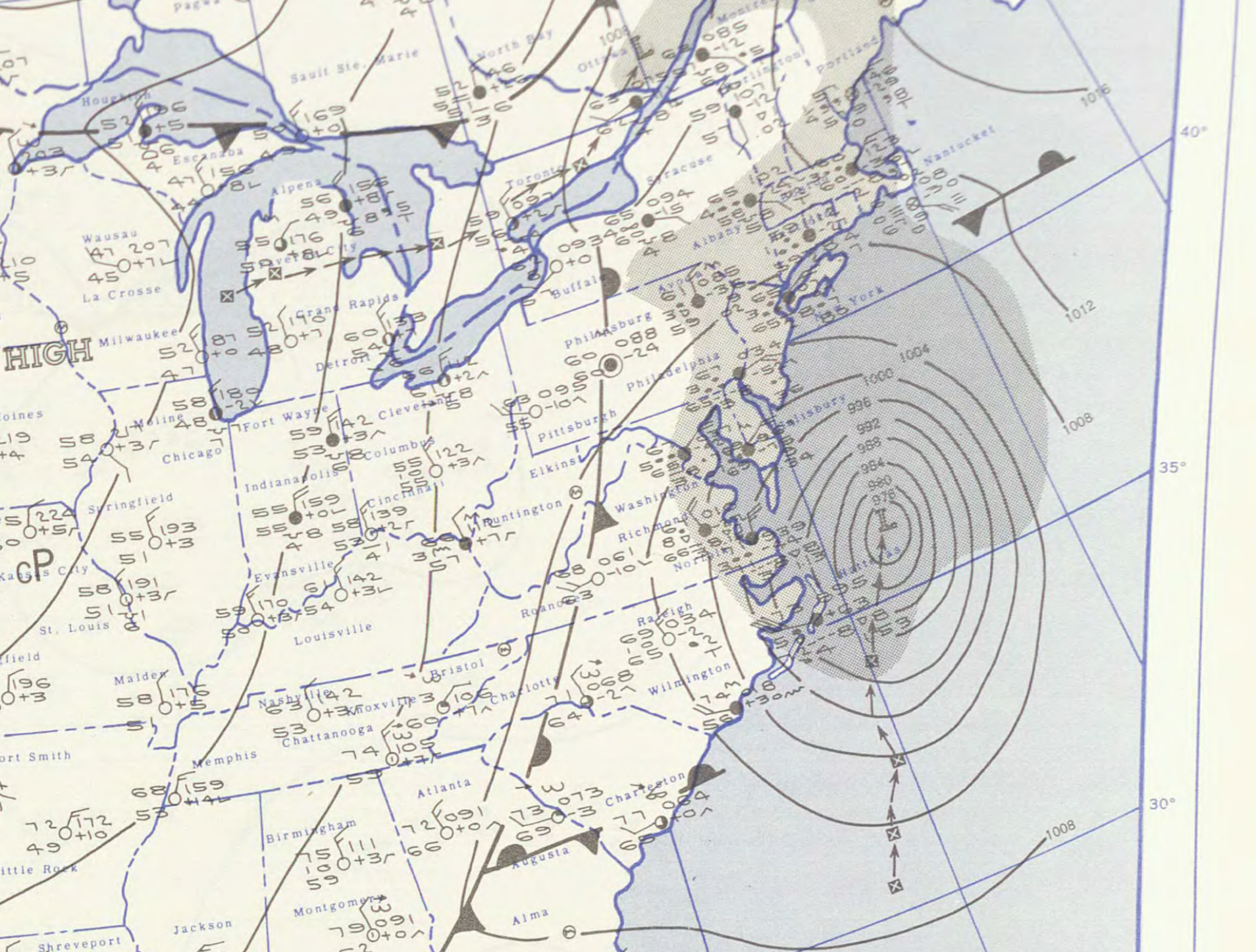
- Surface weather analysis of Hurricane Edna approaching landfall in Massachusetts on September 11

Meteorological history
- Formed: September 2, 1954
- Dissipated: September 15, 1954

Category 3 major hurricane
- 1-minute sustained (SSHWS/NWS)
- Highest winds: 125 mph (205 km/h)
- Lowest pressure: 943 mbar (hPa); 27.85 inHg

Overall effects
- Fatalities: 29
- Damage: >$42.8 million (1954 USD)
- Areas affected: Puerto Rico, Bahamas, North Carolina, Massachusetts, New Hampshire, Maine, Atlantic Canada
- IBTrACS
- Part of the 1954 Atlantic hurricane season

Hurricane Edna was a deadly and destructive major hurricane that impacted the United States East Coast in September of the 1954 Atlantic hurricane season. It was one of two hurricanes to strike Massachusetts in that year, the other being Hurricane Carol. The fifth tropical cyclone and storm of the season, as well as the fourth hurricane and second major hurricane, Edna developed from a tropical wave on September 2. Moving towards the north-northwest, Edna skirted the northern Leeward Islands as a tropical depression before turning more towards the west. The depression attained tropical storm status to the east of Puerto Rico and strengthened further to reach hurricane status by September 7. The storm rapidly intensified and reached its peak intensity of 125 mph (205 km/h) north of the Bahamas before weakening to Category 2 status near landfall in Massachusetts on September 11. Edna transitioned into an extratropical cyclone in Atlantic Canada before its remnants dissipated in the northern Atlantic.

Edna caused 29 fatalities throughout its lifetime as a tropical cyclone, as well as a moderate amount of damage. It first caused rainfall-induced flooding in Puerto Rico, and it later brushed the Bahamas. High waves affected the coastline of North Carolina. Edna resulted in the heaviest day of rainfall in New York City in 45 years, while strong waves cut off Montauk from the remainder of Long Island. There were six highway deaths in the state, and $1.5 million in crop damage. There were widespread evacuations in southern New England, after Hurricane Carol struck the same area only 11 days prior. Strong winds caused extensive power outages for 260,000 people, including nearly all of Cape Cod. Edna became the costliest hurricane in the history of Maine, where the hurricane caused flooding that washed out roads and rail lines. There were 21 deaths in New England, eight of whom in Maine due to drownings. Later, high winds severely damaged crops in Atlantic Canada.

== Meteorological history ==
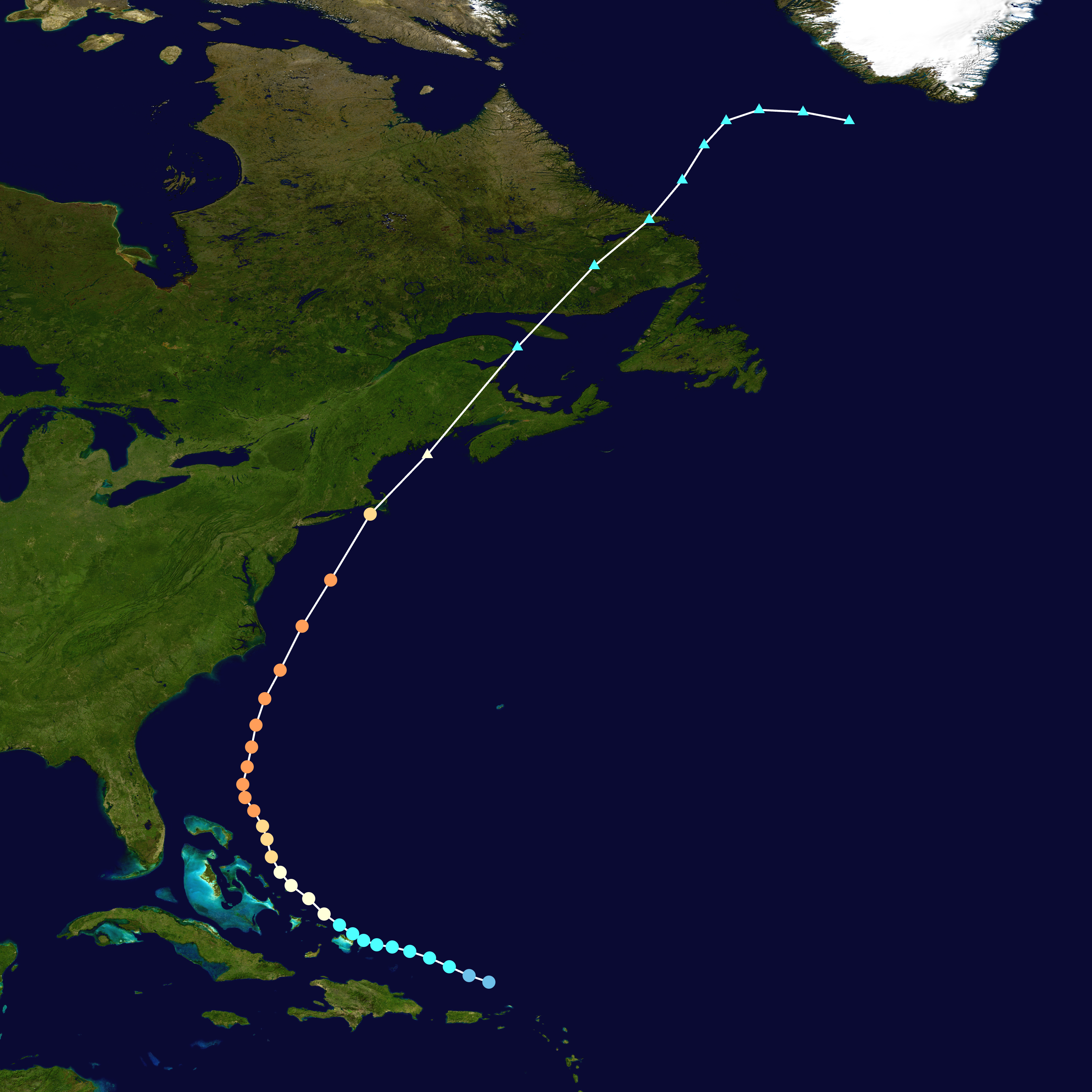
Map plotting the storm's track and intensity, according to the Saffir–Simpson scale Map key Saffir–Simpson scale Tropical depression (≤38 mph, ≤62 km/h) Tropical storm (39–73 mph, 63–118 km/h) Category 1 (74–95 mph, 119–153 km/h) Category 2 (96–110 mph, 154–177 km/h) Category 3 (111–129 mph, 178–208 km/h) Category 4 (130–156 mph, 209–251 km/h) Category 5 (≥157 mph, ≥252 km/h) Unknown Storm type Tropical cyclone Subtropical cyclone Extratropical cyclone, remnant low, tropical disturbance, or monsoon depression

Hurricane Edna originated in an easterly tropical wave which modern research has estimated to have spawned a tropical depression east of the Caribbean Sea on September 2, 1954. The low pressure area was not observed in real time until several days later, on September 5, while situated between Puerto Rico and The Bahamas. Near the disturbance, a ship reported heavy squalls and wind gusts to 70 mph (110 km/h). Additionally, the island of Puerto Rico experienced torrential rainfall in association with the storm. Operationally, the system was not recognized to have organized into a tropical cyclone until September 6; it is listed in the Atlantic hurricane database as achieving tropical storm intensity early on September 4. Edna proceeded west-northwestward, bypassing Hispaniola to the north, and by September 7 it had strengthened into a minimal hurricane on the present-day Saffir–Simpson Hurricane Scale.

Initially a rather small storm in terms of physical size, the hurricane steadily intensified throughout the day. Reconnaissance aircraft flew into the storm frequently to take observations on the cyclone's structure. The center of circulation passed near San Salvador Island, and on September 8, Edna further strengthened into a Category 3 major hurricane while broadly curving northward. Reconnaissance flights indicated a maturing and evolving eye, approximately 20 mi (32 km) in diameter. The overall circulation increased in size as banding features became more well-defined. The storm reached its peak winds of 120 mph (190 km/h) and maintained them for over two days. However, reconnaissance data was at times inconsistent and inaccurate, leading to suspicious and unlikely jogs in the storm's track. The cause of these errors is attributed to misinterpretation of radar information.

Midday on September 9, while tracking nearly due north, Edna's minimum central barometric pressure fell to 968 mbar (28.6 inHg), but is believed to have leveled off shortly thereafter. The radius of hurricane-force winds increased, and the storm may have become asymmetrical, with convection concentrated to the right of the center, although this was not confirmed due to a lack of data. An approaching weak frontal boundary spread overcast conditions over the Eastern Seaboard north of North Carolina. By September 10, Edna was located just south of Cape Hatteras, passing east of the Outer Banks early the next day. As the hurricane accelerated to the northeast, it began to deteriorate and weaken. Closely following the recent track of Hurricane Carol, Edna approached New England, but diverged from Carol's track upon skirting the eastern coast instead of moving inland. Weather reporting stations in the Mid-Atlantic States reported rapid clearing as the storm gained latitude, while heavy rain and gusty winds enveloped New England. On September 11, Edna passed directly over Cape Cod after weakening to Category 2 status, although surface weather analysis depicted a central pressure of 950 mbar (28 inHg). It subsequently tracked just east of Eastport, Maine. The storm continued northeastward into Atlantic Canada and transitioned into an extratropical cyclone, although the exact time of this transition is unknown. The storm's extratropical remnants reemerged into the northern Atlantic after crossing eastern Canada and were last noted on September 15.

== Preparations ==
In advance of the storm, hurricane warnings were issued for parts of The Bahamas and South Florida, as winds of up to hurricane force were expected. Farther to the north, storm warnings were posted from Myrtle Beach, South Carolina to Eastport, Maine. Along the coast of North Carolina and the Virginia Capes, where gale-force winds and high tides were expected, residents were advised to take precautions. In New York City, it was to be considered "a miracle" if Edna did not strike the area directly, and the storm was predicted to be one of the most severe hurricanes in the history of the New York Weather Bureau. In the 24 hours before the storm struck, New York Telephone received 361,392 calls, which was the third highest volume the company ever recorded. In the Montauk area, 500 residents evacuated their homes by early September 11, while all businesses closed in Westerly, Rhode Island. Businesses in Providence, which was flooded during Hurricane Carol, prepared sandbags to mitigate flooding. Most beach homes had closed for the summer season, and hundreds of people who lived along the southern New England coast evacuated. Other threatened areas were evacuated, including Milford, Connecticut, where 3,000 families left their homes. Sirens alerted other residents to remain indoors and drivers to stay off the highways. Along the coast of Connecticut, bus and train service was halted. A state of emergency was declared in New London, and mail service was canceled in some areas. On September 10, the Navy ordered the evacuation of hundreds of warships and aircraft. Coast Guard planes evacuated from Rhode Island and Massachusetts. About 40 Red Cross shelters, which were opened during Hurricane Carol 11 days prior, were reopened to provide food. Officers at Fort Devens sent 40 trucks with cots, blankets, and generators to areas expected to be struck by the storm. Advance warning was credited with a lower death toll in Edna than Carol.

== Impact ==
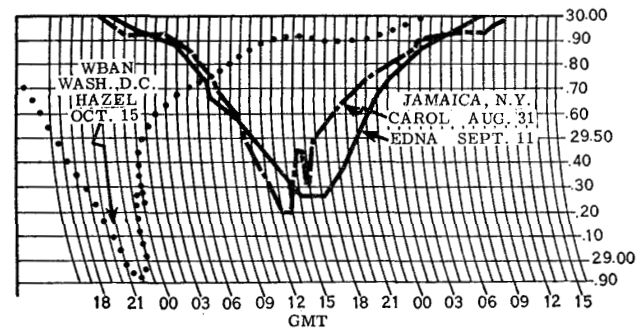
Comparison of pressure readings between hurricanes Carol and Edna at Jamaica, New York, and Hurricane Hazel in Washington, D.C.

=== West Indies ===
On September 7, a bulletin from San Juan, Puerto Rico reported extensive, flood-inducing rainfall along the western and southern coasts of the island. Over 10 in (250 mm) of precipitation fell within a two-day period. The easternmost islands of The Bahamas, including San Salvador, experienced gale-force winds and high seas.

=== United States ===
Edna's path near North Carolina was about 50 mi (80 km) east of Carol. Winds blew at up to 70 mph (110 km/h) along the shore, accompanied by strong surf, although no fatalities or major property damage resulted from the storm. Tides at Norfolk, Virginia were only slightly above normal during the storm's passage to the east, and winds were moderate in strength. Peripheral rainfall in Maryland and Delaware eased drought conditions. In coastal New Jersey, northwesterly winds reached 65 mph (105 km/h), and Long Branch received around 4 in (100 mm) of rainfall. Further north, Long Island also suffered moderate to strong winds, blowing from the north at their peak. A Weather Bureau station in New York City recorded 45 mph (72 km/h) winds midday on September 11. Rainfall reached 4.98 in (126 mm) in the city, becoming the wettest day in 45 years. The storm cut off Montauk Point on eastern Long Island at its height, prompting the Coast Guard to temporarily relocate 500 families. Rainfall in Suffolk County amounted to 9 in (230 mm). Crop damage in New York was estimated at $1.5 million, and six people died in the city due to highway deaths.

When Edna struck New England, it was moving quickly to the northeast at 45 mph (72 km/h). It struck eastern Massachusetts about 100 mi (160 km) east of where Hurricane Carol struck only a week prior. Hurricane-force winds affected much of the coastline, with peak gusts of 120 mph (190 km/h) on Martha's Vineyard offshore Massachusetts, and 110 mph (180 km/h) on Block Island offshore Rhode Island. Along the coast, wind gusts peaked at 100 mph (160 km/h) at Hyannis, Massachusetts. The high winds caused widespread power outages, including for nearly all of Cape Cod. The storm surge reached 6 ft (1.8 m) along the Massachusetts coast, causing flooding and heavy boating damage. Further west, there was lesser coastal flooding, although heavy rainfall after previously wet conditions caused urban and stream flooding; rainfall peaked at around 11 in (280 mm). Damage in Connecticut and Rhode Island was mainly in areas already affected by Hurricane Carol. Several streets were washed out, and rivers rose above flood stage.

Damage was heaviest in Maine, estimated at $25 million, which made Edna the costliest hurricane in the state's history. Strong wind gusts, reaching 74 mph (119 km/h), and heavy rainfall, peaking at 7.49 in (190 mm), extended into the state; these were considered the heaviest rains in the state in 58 years. The Androscoggin and Kennebec rivers both reached above-normal levels, causing flooding and washing out roads. In Augusta, the Kennebec River reached 20.5 ft (6.2 m), which was 5 ft (1.5 m) above the peak level after the spring snow melt. Flooding entered basements, affected fields, and covered bridges. In West Peru, the floods washed out a bridge that was under construction. In addition, the winds downed trees, which blocked widespread roads and caused power outages in 18% of the state. Washed out roads and rail lines cut off the state from the rest of New England. In Lewiston, a trapped car in 5 ft (1.5 m) deep waters required rescue by boat. Another stranded family was rescued after seven hours in Unity, in which one child and a rescuer were killed. There were eight deaths in the state, most of whom related to cars being swept away by floods.

There were 21 deaths in New England, including eight drownings in Maine. Throughout the United States, damage was estimated at $42,815,000. Damage was less from Edna than from Carol, primarily due to its strongest winds not occurring at the time of highest tides, and its track farther to the east. Throughout New England, 260,000 people lost power, most of whom in Massachusetts.

=== Atlantic Canada ===
While rapidly losing characteristics of a tropical cyclone, Edna traversed central New Brunswick. In contrast with the smaller, more compact Hurricane Juan, which struck Atlantic Canada in 2003, Edna was a much larger storm with strong winds extending hundreds of kilometers from the center. The tightest pressure gradient was focused on the east side of the storm, over mainland Nova Scotia. Edna brought down approximately 700 million board feet of timber, and although the amount of trees the storm destroyed was comparable to that of Juan, its effects were more widespread and not as locally severe. Sustained winds reached 160 km/h (99 mph) at Yarmouth and 95 km/h (59 mph) at Halifax. The intense winds downed power and telephone lines and destroyed many barns; one such structural collapse killed a man, and livestock were lost throughout the region. Other damage to property included several fallen chimneys, a toppled church steeple in Pictou, and roof failures. In Kentville, an apartment building undergoing construction was destroyed. Approximately $3 million CAD in apple crops were decimated, while in Yarmouth, both live lobsters and lobster pots were lost. Debris blocked streets across the province, and at least 800 m (0.50 mi) of road was washed out. Damage in Nova Scotia totaled $6 million CAD: in the aftermath, Yarmouth and Kentville declared states of emergency.

In New Brunswick, the storm dropped 130 mm (5.1 in) of rain and produced winds of 120 km/h (75 mph). Wind damage was less significant than in Nova Scotia, although still evident in structures and utility lines. A theatre in McAdam was destroyed, and several people were injured across the area. The storm flooded streets in St. Stephen. About 400 salmon, valued at $10,000 CAD, were lost in Dalhousie. Total damage in the province is estimated at $1.78 million CAD. Elsewhere, power outages were reported in Montreal.

== Aftermath ==
Throughout New England, 20 counties were declared states of emergency. After the storm, Southern New England Telephone sent a crew of 100 workers in 50 trucks to Maine to assist in restoring power. Power was quickly restored, and in some places the outages were less severe than during Carol. For only the third time in its history, the Portland Evening Express was not delivered due to the storm. Most primary roads were re-opened by two days after the storm, although rural areas and rail lines took longer to repair. There was a temporary travel ban for all but emergency vehicles in Maine due to washed out roads. Affecting densely populated portions of the state, Edna struck the day before the governor race between Republican Burton M. Cross and Democratic Edmund Muskie. Before the election, politicians commented how a suppressed turnout as a result of the storm would benefit Muskie, in a state where no Democrat had won governorship since 1934. Muskie ultimately won the election in a close race, which saw a lower turnout than 1950, due in part to Edna suppressing the rural, Republican turnout.

After a survey from the Federal Civil Defense Administration described damage as "tremendous", President Dwight Eisenhower declared portions of Maine as a disaster area, which allocated federal funding for relief. The president also authorized additional aid to Rhode Island and Massachusetts due to additional damage there from Edna.

Due to the severity of the hurricane, the name Edna was removed from the tropical storm naming list for 10 years. The name was reused in the 1968 season, but was permanently retired in the spring of 1969, as the 1954 hurricane was still an active subject of research. None the less, Edna appeared once again on the 1972 naming list, but ultimately went unused. The name will never be used again for another Atlantic hurricane.

== In popular culture ==
In 1954 E.B. White published in The New Yorker "The Eye of Edna," a witty satire that pokes gentle fun at radio announcers who seem to enjoy the hurricane and make exaggerated predictions of its speed and strength.

== See also ==
- Other storms of the same name
- List of New England hurricanes
- Hurricane Bob
