= List of storms named Edna =

The name Edna has been used to name seven tropical cyclones worldwide. Three in the Atlantic Ocean, one in the Western Pacific Ocean, one in the Southwest Indian Ocean, and two in the Australian region.

== Atlantic Ocean ==
- Hurricane Edna (1953) – a Category 3 hurricane that impacted Bermuda
- Hurricane Edna (1954) – a deadly and destructive Category 3 hurricane that impacted the Eastern Coast of the United States
- Tropical Storm Edna (1968) – churned over the Central Atlantic

Due to the 1954 hurricane's severity, the U.S. Weather Bureau removed the name Edna from the tropical system naming lists for 10 years. The name Edna replaced the name Ethel following the 1964 season when the U.S. Weather Bureau dropped the name Ethel from the rotating tropical system naming lists. The name Edna was permanently retired following the 1968 season due to the 1954 hurricane being an active subject of research at the time.

== Western Pacific Ocean ==
- Tropical Storm Edna (1945) - stayed in open ocean and did not affect land.

== Southwest Indian Ocean ==
- Cyclone Edna (1964) - stayed in open ocean and did not affect land.

== Australian Region ==
- Cyclone Edna (1980) - did not affect land.
- Cyclone Edna (2014) - a Category 1 cyclone that impacted the French Territory of New Caledonia
