= Hurricane Carol =

Category 3 Atlantic hurricane in 1954

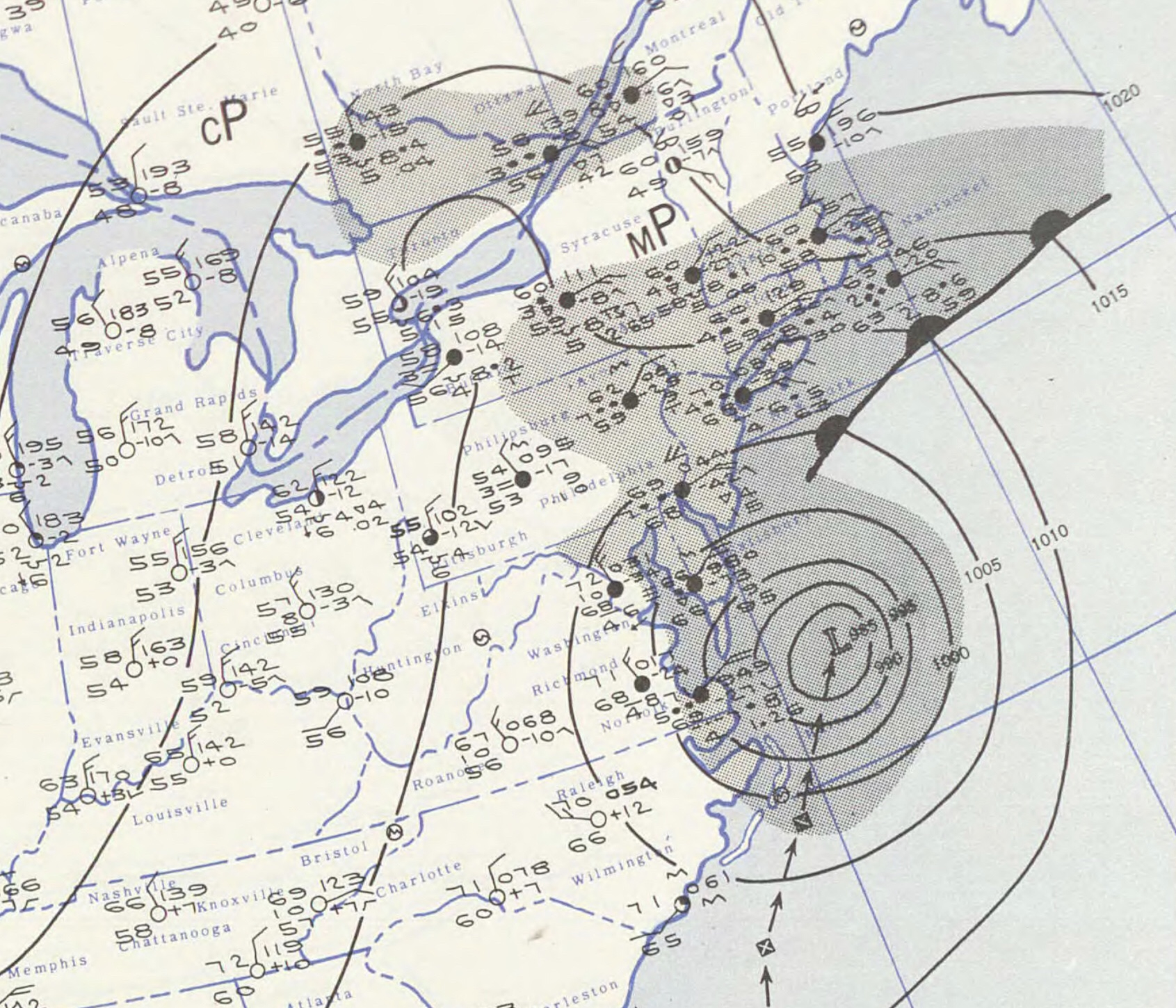
- Surface weather analysis of Hurricane Carol on August 31, just before making landfall in Long Island

Meteorological history
- Formed: August 25, 1954
- Extratropical: August 31, 1954
- Dissipated: September 1, 1954

Category 3 major hurricane
- 1-minute sustained (SSHWS/NWS)
- Highest winds: 115 mph (185 km/h)
- Lowest pressure: 955 mbar (hPa); 28.20 inHg

Overall effects
- Fatalities: 72
- Damage: $462 million (1954 USD)
- Areas affected: Bahamas, North Carolina, New York, New England, Southern Quebec
- IBTrACS
- Part of the 1954 Atlantic hurricane season

Hurricane Carol was among the worst tropical cyclones on record to affect the states of Connecticut and Rhode Island in the United States. It developed from a tropical wave near the Bahamas on August 25, 1954, and slowly strengthened as it moved northwestward. On August 27, Carol intensified to reach winds of 105 mph (169 km/h), but weakened as its motion turned to a northwest drift. A strong trough of low pressure turned the hurricane northeastward, and Carol later intensified into a major hurricane. (Note: A major hurricane is a tropical cyclone with maximum sustained winds of at least 111 mph (179 km/h), or a Category 3 or higher on the Saffir–Simpson hurricane scale.) While paralleling the Mid-Atlantic and Southeastern United States, the storm produced strong winds and rough seas that caused minor coastal flooding and slight damage to houses in North Carolina, Virginia, Washington, D.C., Delaware, and New Jersey. The well-organized hurricane accelerated north-northeastward and made landfall on eastern Long Island, New York, and then over eastern Connecticut on August 31 with sustained winds estimated at 110-mph and a barometric pressure near 956 mb. Carol later transitioned into an extratropical cyclone over New Hampshire, on August 31, 1954.

In New York, strong winds on Long Island damaged about 1,000 houses, left 275,000 people without electricity, downed many trees, and resulted in heavy crop losses. Storm surge flooded LaGuardia Airport and inundated the Montauk Highway, which left the eastern portion of Long Island isolated. Carol also brought strong winds and rough seas to coastal Connecticut, Rhode Island, and southeastern Massachusetts. Throughout the region, about 150,000 people were left without electricity and telephone service. 1,545 houses were destroyed and another 9,720 were damaged. Approximately 3,500 cars and 3,000 boats were destroyed. There were 65 deaths and 1,000 injuries in New England. The storm caused an additional $1 million in damage in Canada as well as two deaths. Overall, Carol caused 72 fatalities and damage totaled $462 million (1954 USD), (Note: All damage totals are in 1954 United States dollars unless otherwise noted.) making it the costliest hurricane in the history of the United States, at the time. Following the storm, the name "Carol" was used once more for a 1965 hurricane that remained far out in the Atlantic, then was permanently retired.

== Meteorological history ==
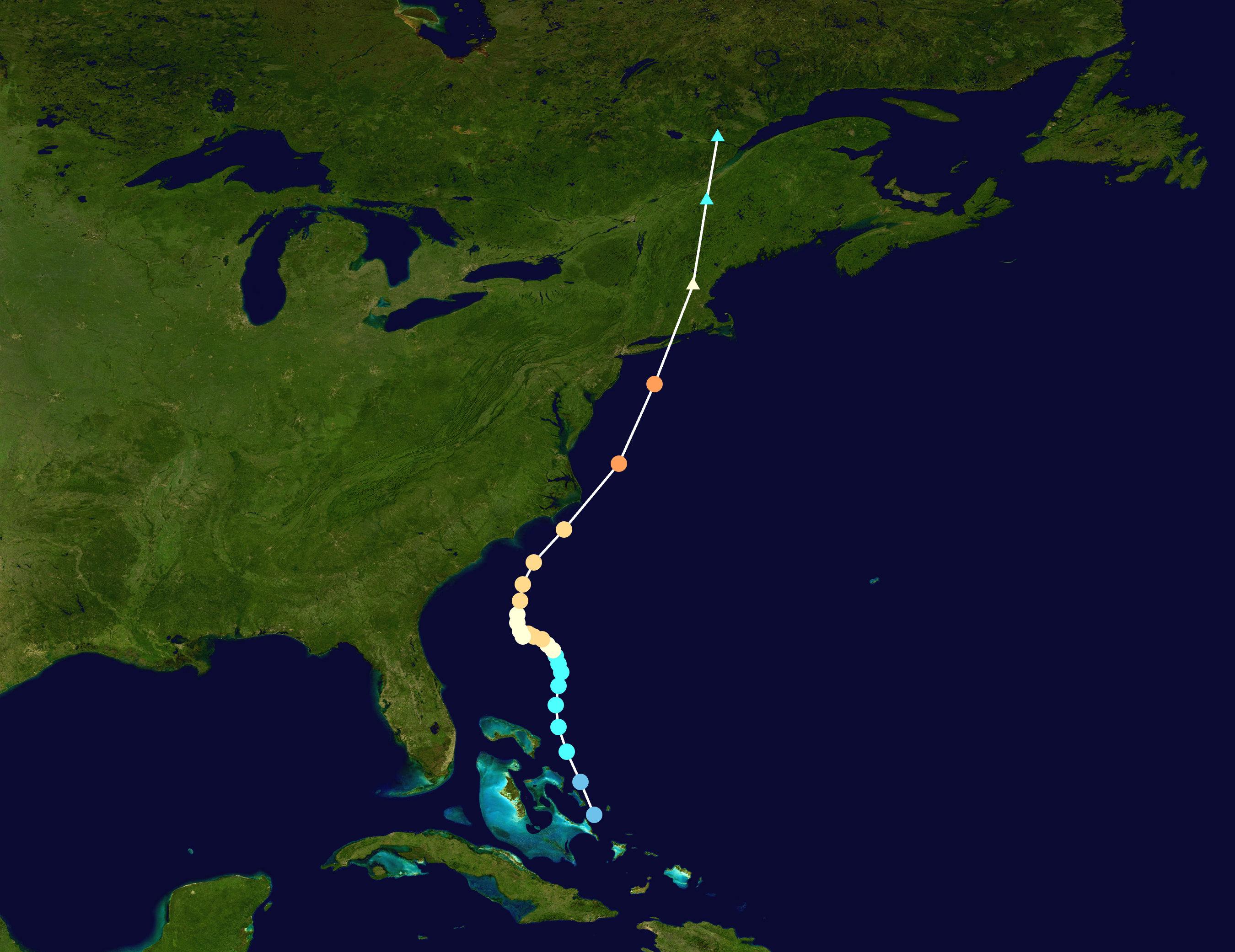
Map plotting the storm's track and intensity, according to the Saffir–Simpson scale Map key Saffir–Simpson scale Tropical depression (≤38 mph, ≤62 km/h) Tropical storm (39–73 mph, 63–118 km/h) Category 1 (74–95 mph, 119–153 km/h) Category 2 (96–110 mph, 154–177 km/h) Category 3 (111–129 mph, 178–208 km/h) Category 4 (130–156 mph, 209–251 km/h) Category 5 (≥157 mph, ≥252 km/h) Unknown Storm type Tropical cyclone Subtropical cyclone Extratropical cyclone, remnant low, tropical disturbance, or monsoon depression

A tropical wave spawned a tropical depression over the northeastern Bahamas on August 25. It moved to the north-northwest and intensified into a tropical storm early on August 26. Receiving the name Carol, the storm gradually turned to the north, and strengthened under generally favorable conditions. On August 26, the Hurricane Hunters reported an eye, 23 miles (37 km) in diameter despite Carol being a tropical storm. The next day, Carol strengthened to attain hurricane status while located about 345 miles (555 km) east of Cape Canaveral, Florida. With a large anticyclone persisting across the southeastern United States, the motion of Carol turned to a northwest drift. The hurricane continued to strengthen, and Carol reached an initial peak intensity of 105 mph (169 km/h) on August 28. By that time, it was a small hurricane, and the radius of maximum winds was smaller than normal for its latitude and central pressure. After maintaining peak intensity for 30 hours and moving a distance of about 75 miles (121 km), Carol weakened slightly off the coast of Georgia.

An eastward moving deep-wave trough intensified as it moved through the eastern United States. This caused Carol to accelerate as it turned to the north and north-northeast. On August 30, the hurricane again strengthened to reach Category 2 status while located 180 miles (290 km) east of Savannah, Georgia. Early on August 31, Carol passed very near Cape Hatteras, North Carolina with reconnaissance aircraft intensity estimates from 75–125 mph (121–201 km/h). The hurricane continued north-northeastward with a forward motion of up to 39 mph (63 km/h), and Carol intensified further to make landfall on eastern Long Island as a Category 3 hurricane with peak winds of 115 mph (185 km/h). After quickly crossing Long Island Sound, the hurricane made landfall again near Groton, Connecticut. Carol had maintained its small structure and well-defined eye, and observers on both eastern Long Island and Groton, Connecticut reported blue skies and light winds as the eye passed overhead, followed by strong hurricane-force winds. The landfall intensity was based on a pressure of 957 mbar (28.3 inHg) recorded in Groton, Connecticut. Ninety percent of homes in the Groton Long Point area were destroyed by the storm surge and winds in Hurricane Carol. Carol quickly lost tropical characteristics while crossing into inland eastern Massachusetts, and became extratropical over southwestern New Hampshire, late on August 31. The powerful extratropical storm continued northward, before losing its identity after entering Canada, over Southern Quebec.

== Impact ==
=== Mid-Atlantic ===
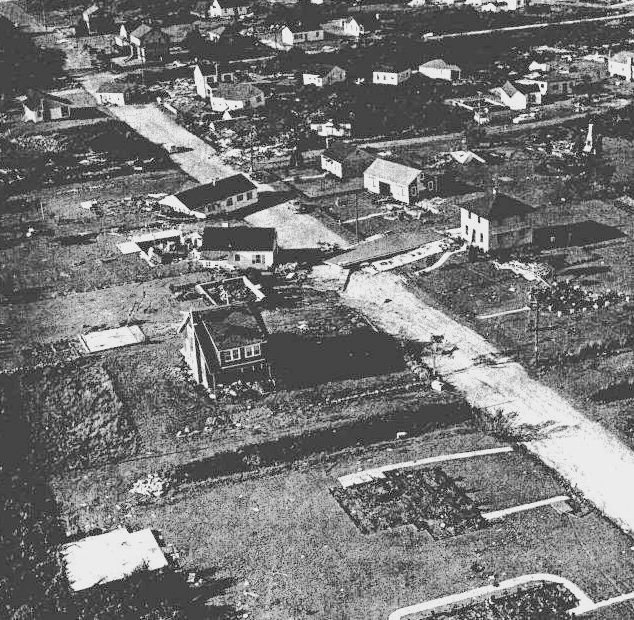
Damage from Carol in Rhode Island

Before affecting North Carolina, the threat of Carol prompted a hurricane warning from Wilmington to Manteo. Storm warnings were issued southward to Charleston. Residents evacuated north of Wilmington along the ocean. While passing by the state, the strongest winds remained to the east of Hurricane Carol, though winds of 90 to 100 mph (140 to 160 km/h) were reported at Cape Hatteras. Further inland, the hurricane produced a wind gust of 55 mph (89 km/h) in Wilmington and 65 mph (105 km/h) in Cherry Point. The winds resulted in agricultural damage to the corn and soy bean crop. High winds caused minor damage to roofs and houses, and also downed some trees and power lines. Near the coast, waves from the storm damaged fishing piers, and flooding was reported in New Bern. High waves also damaged coastal roadways. Damage in the state totaled to around $228,000. Carol passed 100 miles (160 km) to the east of Virginia, and produced 40 mph (64 km/h) winds in Virginia Beach. The hurricane produced 4 inches (100 mm) of rain in Norfolk. Further to the northwest, rainfall from the system alleviated drought conditions in the Washington, D.C. area. Damage was minor from Virginia to Delaware, where light rains fell. Precipitation also extended into Pennsylvania.

In New Jersey, high winds downed power lines, which killed two people. Along the coast, high waves damaged boardwalks and caused flooding. In neighboring Pennsylvania, Carol caused a tractor to crash into a train, resulting in two deaths. Damage in the state was estimated at $250,000.

On eastern Long Island near where Carol made landfall, a pressure of 960 mbar (28 inHg) was recorded. Winds on the island gusted to 125 mph (200 km/h), leaving thousands of homes without power. The winds downed many trees, and left heavy crop damage to various fruits. High winds damaged widespread homes, boats, and cars. About 1,000 houses were damaged on the island, and 275,000 people lost power. The hurricane's storm surge covered the Montauk Highway in Montauk, effectively isolating eastern Long Island for a period of time. Flooding also affected LaGuardia Airport. Due to the compact nature of the storm, areas west of Fire Island were largely unaffected by the hurricane. There were power outages in New York City, but little damage. Damage was estimated at $5 million in the state, and one death was reported, after thousands of people evacuated.

=== New England and Canada ===
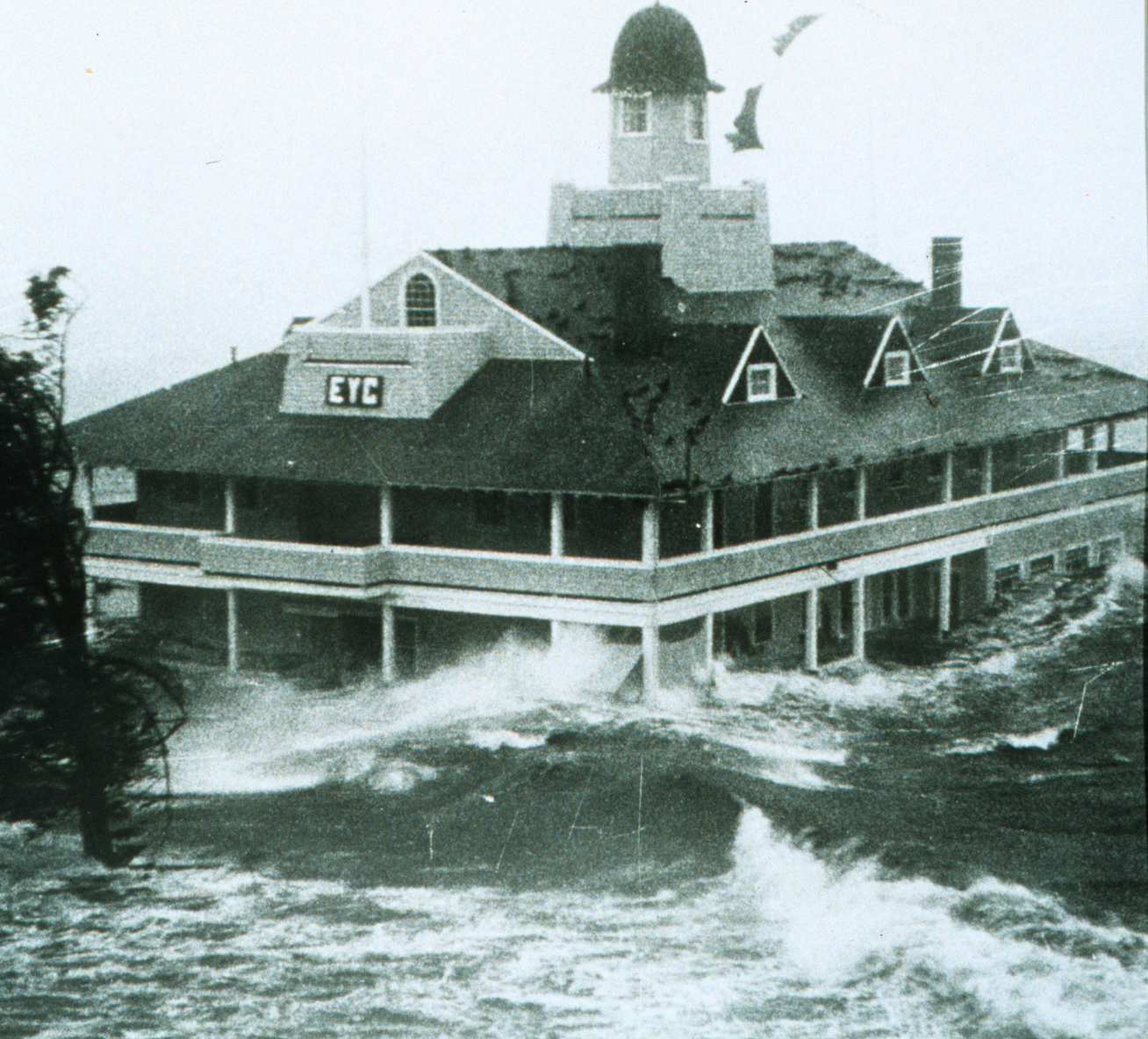
Edgewood Yacht Club withstands the storm surge from Carol in Rhode Island.

Hurricane Carol produced hurricane and gale-force winds across New England. Strong winds from Hurricane Carol destroyed nearly 40% of the apple, corn, peach, and tomato crops from eastern Connecticut to Cape Cod. Overall crop damage was estimated at $22.25 million. The hurricane destroyed several thousand homes in New England, many of which were destroyed from the waters or the powerful winds. Overall, 11,785 families were directly impacted by the hurricane, including 9,720 houses that were damaged and 1,545 that were destroyed. High winds left over 150,000 people without power in New England, potentially as many as one-third of all of New England, and many residents also lost phone service. The hurricane also destroyed 3,500 cars and 3,000 boats in the region. Heavy rainfall from the storm caused traffic accidents, but only minor flooding.

Throughout the United States, Hurricane Carol caused $461 million in damage, mostly in New England, making it the costliest Atlantic hurricane at the time. There were 65 deaths in New England, and about 1,000 injured people. Despite the high damage, advance warning allowed for many fewer deaths than the total of 488 fatalities during the 1938 New England hurricane, which affected the same area with similar strength. However, some areas did not receive advance warning, due to power outages preventing people from receiving Weather Bureau warnings ahead of the storm.

Hurricane Carol struck Connecticut shortly after high tide, and its combination with 10 to 15 feet (3.0 to 4.6 m) storm surges from New London eastward produced widespread tidal flooding. About 2,000 people were stranded when a rail line between New Haven and Rhode Island was flooded. The heaviest rainfall associated with the passage of the storm occurred in New London, where up to 6 inches (150 mm) fell and wind blew off a portion of the city hall roof. These strong winds left much of the eastern portion of the state without power. Near the coast, the combination of strong winds and the storm surge damaged or destroyed thousands of buildings, including 100 destroyed houses. Many other homes in Eastern Connecticut were damaged by falling trees. Thousands had evacuated before the storm reached the area, and one person died in the state. Due to the compact nature of the storm, western Connecticut experienced little effects from Carol. Overall damage in the state was estimated at $50 million.

The hurricane produced a record-high wind gust of 135 mph (217 km/h) at Block Island, while on mainland Rhode Island, sustained winds peaked at 90 mph (140 km/h) in Warwick with gusts to 105 mph (169 km/h). Upon making landfall around high tide, Carol produced a storm surge of up to 14.4 feet (4.4 m) in Narragansett Bay, surpassing that of the New England Hurricane of 1938. The resulting storm surge flooded downtown Providence with 12 feet (3.7 m) of water. News reports indicated that the floods covered the area with 4 feet (1.2 m) in about an hour. The winds downed two broadcasting towers in the city. Westerly was also flooded, where 200 homes were washed away. There was also heavy damage in Newport, where the Newport Casino was damaged. Some entire coastal communities were nearly destroyed, and 620 houses and 83 other buildings were destroyed in the state. The winds destroyed the roofs of hundreds of buildings, forcing many to evacuate to shelters during the passage of the storm. The powerful winds also downed thousands of trees and power lines, blacking out the entire state and interrupting 95 percent of phone service. Damage in the state totaled about $200 million, and there were at least 17 deaths in Rhode Island.

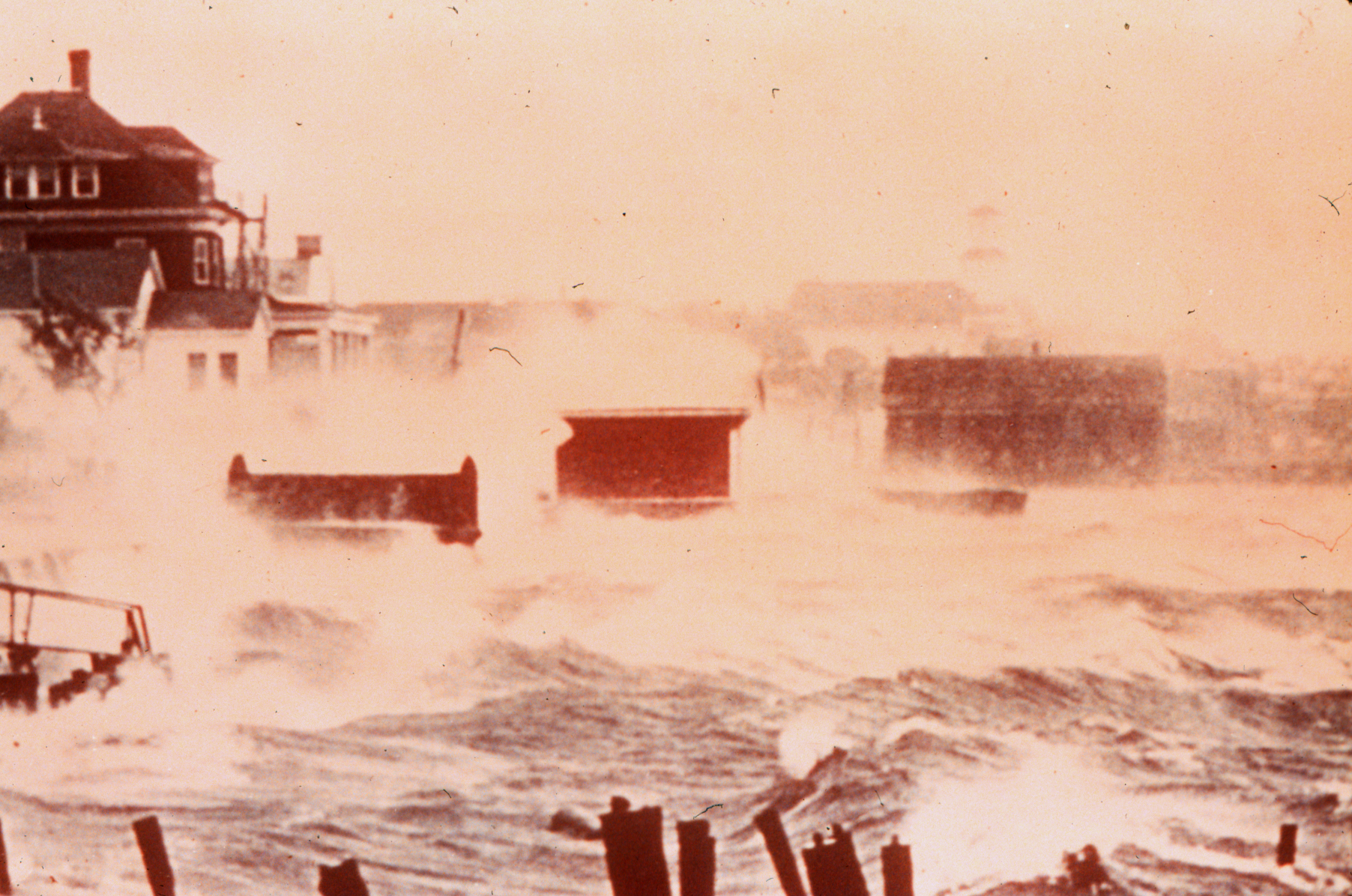
Storm surge from Hurricane Carol in Connecticut.

Before Carol affected the area, 20,000 people evacuated from Cape Cod. In Massachusetts, the hurricane produced winds between 80 and 110 mph (130 and 180 km/h) across much of the eastern part of the state. Gusts reached 80 mph (130 km/h) at Blue Hill Meteorological Observatory, and the highest gusts in the state were around 125 mph (201 km/h). The winds downed about 50 million board feet of trees in the state, many of which fell onto power lines; much of eastern Massachusetts lost power during the storm. Carol left about $15 million in crop damage in the state. The winds destroyed much of the corn crop, about half of the peach crop, and about 1.5 million bushels of apples.

Heavy damage was reported throughout Boston, where high winds destroyed the spire of the Old North Church, the location of the hung lanterns during Paul Revere's ride. It was a replacement spire, after a hurricane in 1804 destroyed the original. In Wareham, about 1,500 people were left homeless. Statewide, 3,350 homes were damaged to some degree, and another 800 were destroyed. The hurricane destroyed another 213 buildings and severely damaged. Near the coast, strong storm surges were reported, and a 20 feet (6.1 m) storm tide was reported at New Bedford, setting a record. At least 15 deaths were reported in the state, and damage was estimated at $175 million.

In Dedham, Massachusetts, the hurricane knocked down the 80-foot bell tower on the East Dedham firehouse, today the oldest wooden firehouse in the country. The tower flew across the station and landed on 219 Bussey St, the house next door, where Louise Guerrio was feeding her one-year-old son, Joseph. It also crushed three cars parked on Bussey St.

Carol maintained its intensity as it moved inland, and its winds were strong enough to knock down trees and power lines in New Hampshire. One tree fell onto a car, killing a person, and there were three deaths overall in the state, along with $3 million in damage. There was also a death in neighboring Vermont. Carol produced winds of up to 80 mph (130 km/h) in Augusta, Maine. Throughout the state, the winds downed hundreds of trees, some of which damaged houses, wrecked cars, destroyed one building, or fell onto power lines. Fallen trees blocked highways, and one person was injured by a falling tree limb. Downed power lines left several counties without power or telephone services. The winds flattened hundreds of acres of corn in North Livermore, and throughout the state, there was heavy damage to the apple crop. Damage to the apple crop amounted to $1.7 million. While moving west of Maine, the hurricane dropped heavy rainfall, including a report of 2.15 inches (55 mm) in 12 hours. Along the coast, high waves damaged boats. In Maine, the hurricane killed three people, injured at least eight, and caused $10 million in damage, the costliest natural disaster in the state's history. Carol lost this distinction 10 days later when Hurricane Edna caused $15 million in damage in the state.

Rainfall in Canada peaked at 4.27 inches (108 mm) in Quebec. In Yarmouth, Nova Scotia, wind gusts peaked at 47 mph (76 km/h). In Quebec, the extratropical remnants of Carol downed trees and power lines in Montreal from wind gusts as high as 55 mph (89 km/h). Widespread power outages were reported in New Brunswick and Quebec, and downed trees struck three cars in Saint John, New Brunswick. The storm caused flights to be canceled, trees and power lines came down in Montreal due to 60 m.p.h. wind gusts, and road underpasses were flooded. Damage there totaled about $1 million (1954 CAD, US$980,000) (Note: $1 million in 1954 Canadian dollars (CAD) would be $8.66 million in 2013 CAD, adjusted for inflation figures from the Bank of Canada. When converted to USD, the total would be $8.5 million as provided by the Oanda Corporation, which would be about $980,000 when adjusted for inflation to 1954.). Two people were killed, one of whom due to drowning on a sunken barge in Quebec City.

== Aftermath ==
Governor of Rhode Island Dennis J. Roberts declared martial law for the state after Carol caused heavy damage. In Massachusetts, the National Guard were deployed to six towns to prevent looting. National Guardsmen flew a plane of dry ice from Newark, New Jersey to Boston to assist the widespread areas without power and refrigeration. Widespread areas were without power for days, and in some areas for up to a week, until crews could repair downed lines. Spoiled food due to lack of refrigeration resulted in about $1 million in losses. Power crews from elsewhere in the United States arrived to assist in the restoration. Workers quickly removed trees from highways. Damaged factories in Rhode Island prevented employees from working for three weeks after the storm. The steeple of the Old North Church in Boston was rebuilt in 1955, after residents throughout the country provided $150,000 in donations. Governor of Maine Burton M. Cross declared a state of emergency for the state. The Small Business Administration declared six counties in Maine as disaster areas. In the days after the storm, President of the United States Dwight Eisenhower declared Massachusetts and Rhode Island as federal disaster areas. The federal government provided financial aid, amounting to $1.5 million in Massachusetts. The president ordered for troops to assist in the aftermath. The American Red Cross quickly deployed teams to the most affected areas, feeding hundreds of families. About 12 days after Carol struck New England, Hurricane Edna struck eastern Massachusetts, causing an additional $40 million in damage and 20 deaths. More disaster aid was provided after the second hurricane.

The heavy damage caused by this and other hurricanes in 1954 prompted the United States government to devote research to set up the National Hurricane Research Project. Hurricane Hunters and the Weather Bureau collected data on subsequent hurricanes to determine their structure, as well as attempted to weaken storms with silver iodide via Project Stormfury.

Due to the heavy damage, the name Carol was removed from the tropical storm naming list for 10 years. The name was reused in the 1965 season, but was permanently retired in the spring of 1969, as the 1954 hurricane was still an active subject of research. The selected replacement name, Camille, was used soon thereafter during the 1969 season.

== See also ==
- List of North Carolina hurricanes
- Hurricane Bob (1991) – similar track and intensity
- Hurricane Irene (2011) – made landfall in New England
- Hurricane Sandy (2012) – broke many of Carol's records, including the costliest hurricane in New England

== Notes ==
Preceded by 1938 New England (Long Island Express)	Costliest Atlantic hurricanes on Record; 1954	Succeeded by Diane
