= List of costliest Atlantic hurricanes =

Damage in Long Beach, Mississippi following Hurricane Katrina.

This is a list of the costliest Atlantic hurricanes, with US$1 billion (nominal) in property damage, broadly capturing the severity of the damage each tropical cyclone has caused. The list includes tropical storms, a tropical cyclone with a peak 1-minute maximum sustained wind in the range of 39–73 mph (63–118 km/h), placing them below the 74 mph (119 km/h) minimum needed to attain hurricane status.

== History ==
The number of $1 billion Atlantic hurricanes almost doubled from the 1980s to the 2010s, and inflation-adjusted costs have increased more than elevenfold. The increases have been attributed to climate change, more people moving to coastal areas, and the dramatic increase in construction costs since 1980.

The record of the costliest tropical cyclone in the Atlantic is held jointly by hurricanes Katrina (2005) and Harvey (2017), both of which resulted in approximately $125 billion in property damage during the year they occurred. These storms are also the costliest tropical cyclones recorded worldwide. The hurricane seasons of those two hurricanes, the 2005 and 2017 Atlantic hurricane seasons, are also the second costliest, and most costly hurricane seasons recorded.

Most of the costliest Atlantic hurricanes in recorded history have peaked as major hurricanes. However, weaker tropical cyclones can still cause widespread damage. Tropical storms Alberto (1994), Allison (2001), Lee (2011), Imelda (2019), and Fred (2021) each caused over a billion dollars in damage. As of 2025, no numbered tropical depressions have become a billion-dollar disaster.

List of costliest Atlantic hurricane seasons (as of 2026)
Rank	Cost	Season
1	≥ $294.811 billion	2017
2	$179.253 billion	2005
3	$131 billion	2024
4	$118 billion	2022
5	≥ $80.78 billion	2021
6	$72.34 billion	2012
7	$60.4 billion	2004
8	$54.336 billion	2020
9	≥ $50.526 billion	2018
10	≥ $49.53 billion	2008

Flooding typically accounts for about 60% of all of a storm's damages, and this is reflected in the list with Harvey, Florence, Ida, and Helene; all which produced catastrophic rainfall; and with Katrina, Ike, Sandy, and Ian which produced devastating storm surges. Wind damage encompasses a large portion of storm damage as well, evidenced by Andrew, Irma, and Michael. Due to their excessive damage, the names of tropical cyclones accruing at least $1 billion in damage are usually retired by the World Meteorological Organization, but this is not always the case. Juan in 1985 was the first hurricane to cause at least a billion in damage and not be retired; its name was retired after a later usage (2003) that did not cause over a billion in damage. Since Juan, nine tropical cyclones that caused at least a billion in damage were not retired, the most notable of which being Sally in 2020 which caused at least $7.3 billion, the costliest storm not to have its name retired. As of 2025, the most recent billion-dollar hurricanes to not have their names retired were Debby, Francine and Rafael in 2024.

The first hurricane to cause at least $1 billion in damage was Betsy in 1965, which caused much of its damage in southeastern Louisiana. Four years later, Camille caused over $1 billion in damage as it ravaged Louisiana and Mississippi at landfall, and Virginia after moving inland. After the 1960s, each decade saw an increase in tropical cyclones causing at least a billion in damage over the last, due to increasing urban development and population. In the 1970s, four hurricanes caused at least a billion in damage; the costliest of which was Agnes, which caused $2.1 billion in damage. The following decade featured seven hurricanes causing at least a billion in damage. In the 1990s, twelve tropical cyclones accrued at least a billion in damage, including Hurricane Andrew in 1992. The system greatly exceeded the damage figure of any preceding tropical cyclone, causing $27.3 billion in damage, mostly in South Florida. Nineteen tropical cyclones in the 2000s caused at least $1 billion in damage. The 2005 season had six billion-dollar hurricanes, the most of any season on record; this record was later surpassed in 2020, with eight billion-dollar hurricanes. Hurricanes Ivan (2004) and Irma (2017) caused at least $1 billion in damage in four separate countries. In the 2010s, twelve storms caused at least $1 billion in damage. Hanna was the first storm of the 2020s to become a billion dollar disaster.

== Methodology ==
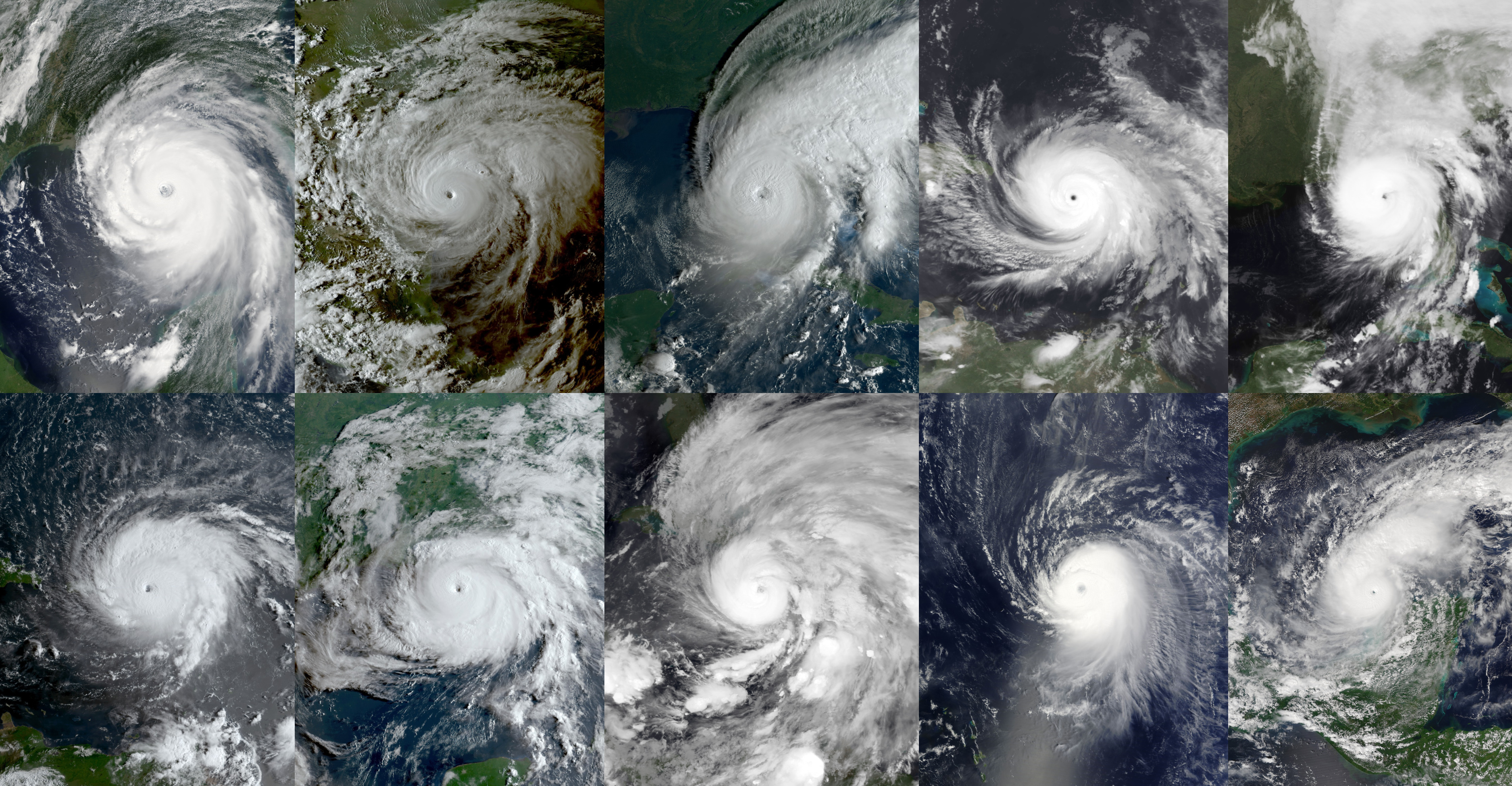
A collage of the top ten costliest Atlantic hurricanes, up to 2025, in descending cost from top left to lower right.

This list ranks tropical cyclones within the Atlantic that have accrued at least US$1 billion in damage, based on their nominal USD damage totals. Because the impact of inflation has not been adjusted out of these figures, they do not allow for the fact that $0.12 billion in 1965 (the earliest hurricane shown on the list) would be equivalent to $0.9 billion in 2025, or that it would require $7.8 billion in 2025 to be equivalent to $1 billion in 1965. Furthermore, the figures have not been adjusted for changes in population and wealth in coastal counties, making it hard to accurately compare the damage inflicted by hurricanes over time.

In 2018, Roger A. Pielke Jr. and Christopher Landsea published a peer-reviewed study in the scientific journal Nature Sustainability, which gave an estimate of the direct economic losses in the continental United States from 1900 to 2017 from each hurricane if that same event was to occur under contemporary (2017) societal conditions. The general formula for normalized losses $D_{2018}$ is

$$D_{2018} = D_{y} \times I_{y} \times RWPC_{y} \times P_{2018/y}$$

where $D_{y}$ is reported damage in current-year US dollars, $I_{y}$ is the GDP deflator for inflation adjustment, $RWPC_{y}$ is an estimate of current-cost net stock of fixed assets and consumer durable goods to capture changes in real wealth per-capita, and $P_{2018/y}$ county population adjustment.

As the results of the Pielke / Landsea study do not extend beyond 2017, the column for normalized damage, shown in the list, is not available beyond that year.

== Overall costliest ==
was the costliest Atlantic hurricane at the time it dissipated
data not available as source report ends with 2017

† indicates that the storm's impact in that season did not result in its name being retired

Costliest Atlantic hurricanes
Name	Nominal damage (Billions USD)	Normalized damage (Billions USD)	Season	Storm classification at peak intensity	Areas affected	References
Katrina	$125.0	$226.21	2005	Category 5 hurricane	Louisiana; Mississippi; The Bahamas; United States Gulf Coast; South Florida; Northeast; Eastern Canada	
Harvey	$125.0	$164.70	2017	Category 4 hurricane	Texas; Louisiana; South America; Central America; The Caribbean; Yucatan Peninsula	
Ian	$112.0	data not available	2022	Category 5 hurricane	Trinidad and Tobago; Venezuela; Colombia; ABC islands; Jamaica; Cayman Island; Cuba; Southeast United States	
Maria	$91.6	data not available	2017	Category 5 hurricane	Puerto Rico; Lesser Antilles; Greater Antilles; Caribbean Sea; Eastern United States	
Helene	$78.7	data not available	2024	Category 4 hurricane	Yucatán Peninsula; Honduras; Cayman Islands; Cuba; Southeastern United States; Midwestern United States	
Irma	$77.2	$74.17	2017	Category 5 hurricane	Lesser Antilles; Greater Antilles; Caribbean Sea; Eastern United States	
Ida	$75.3	$81.88	2021	Category 4 hurricane	Venezuela; Colombia; Panama; Cayman Islands; Cuba; Southeastern United States; Northeastern United States; Canada	
Sandy	$68.7	$104.19	2012	Category 3 hurricane	The Caribbean; United States East Coast; Eastern Canada	
Ike	$38.0	$60.48	2008	Category 4 hurricane	Greater Antilles; Texas; Louisiana; Midwestern United States; Eastern Canada; Iceland	
Milton	$34.6	data not available	2024	Category 5 hurricane	Mexico; Florida; The Bahamas	
Andrew	$27.3	$125.16	1992	Category 5 hurricane	The Bahamas; Florida; Louisiana	
Wilma	$26.5	$45.08	2005	Category 5 hurricane	Greater Antilles; Central America; Florida	
Ivan	$26.1	$48.38	2004	Category 5 hurricane	The Caribbean; Venezuela; United States Gulf Coast	
Michael	$25.5	$32.21	2018	Category 5 hurricane	Central America; Florida; Georgia; United States Gulf Coast; Eastern United States; Eastern Canada; Iberian Peninsula	
Florence	$24.2	$33.56	2018	Category 4 hurricane	West Africa; Cape Verde; Bermuda; Eastern United States; Atlantic Canada	
Laura	$23.3	$20.98	2020	Category 4 hurricane	Leeward Islands; Puerto Rico; Dominican Republic; Haiti; Cuba; Southeastern United States	
Rita	$18.5	$35.04	2005	Category 5 hurricane	Cuba; Texas; Louisiana	
Charley	$16.9	$53.75	2004	Category 4 hurricane	Jamaica; Cayman Islands; Cuba; Florida; The Carolinas	
Matthew	$16.5	$15.17	2016	Category 5 hurricane	Colombia; Venezuela; The Caribbean; United States East Coast	
Irene	$14.2	$23.23	2011	Category 3 hurricane	The Caribbean; United States East Coast; Eastern Canada	
Melissa	$12.2	data not available	2025	Category 5 hurricane	Windward Islands; Greater Antilles (particularly Jamaica, Hispaniola, and Cuba)	
Hugo	$11.0	$48.33	1989	Category 5 hurricane	The Caribbean; United States East Coast	
Frances	$10.1	$25.74	2004	Category 4 hurricane	The Caribbean; Eastern United States; Ontario	
Georges	$9.3	<$8.0	1998	Category 4 hurricane	The Caribbean; United States Gulf Coast	
Beryl	$9.0	data not available	2024	Category 5 hurricane	Barbados; Venezuela; Caribbean; Yucatán Peninsula; United States; Eastern Canada	
Allison	$9.0	<$8.0	2001	Tropical storm	Texas; Louisiana; Southern United States	
Gustav	$8.3	<$8.0	2008	Category 4 hurricane	Hispaniola; Jamaica; Cuba; Louisiana	
Jeanne	$7.9	$19.7	2004	Category 3 hurricane	The Caribbean; Eastern United States	
Sally †	$7.3	$9.4	2020	Category 2 hurricane	The Bahamas; Florida; Southeastern United States	
Eta	$7.2	data not available	2020	Category 4 hurricane	The Caribbean; Central America; Cuba; Eastern United States	
Floyd	$6.5	$32.62	1999	Category 4 hurricane	The Bahamas; Eastern United States; Atlantic Canada	
Mitch	$6.1	<$8.0	1998	Category 5 hurricane	Central America; Yucatán Peninsula; South Florida	
Isabel	$5.5	$13.19	2003	Category 5 hurricane	Greater Antilles; The Bahamas; Eastern United States; Ontario	
Dorian	$5.1	data not available	2019	Category 5 hurricane	The Caribbean; The Bahamas; Eastern United States; Atlantic Canada	
Imelda †	$5.0	data not available	2019	Tropical storm	Texas; Louisiana; Oklahoma; Arkansas	
Fran	$5.0	$30.73	1996	Category 3 hurricane	Eastern United States; Ontario	
Isaias †	$5.0	data not available	2020	Category 1 hurricane	Puerto Rico; Dominican Republic; Haiti; Bahamas; Eastern United States	
Opal	$4.7	$22.5	1995	Category 4 hurricane	Guatemala; Yucatán Peninsula; Eastern United States	
Zeta †	$4.4	data not available	2020	Category 3 hurricane	Jamaica; Yucatan Peninsula; Louisiana; Mississippi	
Debby †	$4.3	data not available	2024	Category 1 hurricane	Caribbean; East Coast of the United States; Atlantic Canada	
Dennis	$4.0	<$8.0	2005	Category 4 hurricane	Greater Antilles; Southeastern United States	
Stan	$3.9	<$8.0	2005	Category 1 hurricane	Mexico; Central America	
Karl †	$3.9	<$8.0	2010	Category 3 hurricane	Mexico; Central America	
Idalia †	$3.5	data not available	2023	Category 4 hurricane	Yucatán Peninsula; Cuba; Eastern United States	
Fiona	$3.4	data not available	2022	Category 4 hurricane	Lesser Antilles; Puerto Rico; Dominican Republic; Bahamas; Turks and Caicos Islands; Bermuda; Eastern Canada	
Luis	$3.3	<$8.0	1995	Category 4 hurricane	Leeward Islands; Puerto Rico; Bermuda	
Isaac †	$3.1	<$8.0	2012	Category 1 hurricane	The Caribbean; Eastern United States	
Delta †	$3.0	data not available	2020	Category 4 hurricane	Jamaica; Cayman Islands; Yucatan Peninsula; Southeastern United States	
Alicia	$3.0	$28.68	1983	Category 3 hurricane	East Texas; Louisiana	
Gilbert	$3.0	<$8.0	1988	Category 5 hurricane	Venezuela; Central America; Hispaniola; Mexico	
Lee †	$2.8	<$8.0	2011	Tropical storm	Louisiana; Mississippi; Pennsylvania; New York	
Marilyn	$2.5	<$8.0	1995	Category 3 hurricane	The Caribbean; Bermuda	
Michelle	$2.4	<$8.0	2001	Category 4 hurricane	Central America; Jamaica; Cuba; The Bahamas	
Agnes	$2.1	$50.7	1972	Category 1 hurricane	Mexico; Cuba; Eastern United States	
Joan	$2.0	<$8.0	1988	Category 4 hurricane	Lesser Antilles; Colombia; Venezuela; Central America	
Fifi	$1.8	<$8.0	1974	Category 2 hurricane	Jamaica; Central America; Mexico	
Frederic	$1.8	$22.19	1979	Category 4 hurricane	The Caribbean; Southeastern United States	
Dean	$1.7	<$8.0	2007	Category 5 hurricane	The Caribbean; Central America	
Dolly †	$1.6	<$8.0	2008	Category 2 hurricane	Cayman Islands; Mexico; Southwestern United States	
Allen	$1.6	<$8.0	1980	Category 5 hurricane	The Caribbean; Yucatán Peninsula; Mexico; South Texas	
David	$1.5	<$8.0	1979	Category 5 hurricane	The Caribbean; United States East Coast	
Alex †	$1.5	<$8.0	2010	Category 2 hurricane	Central America; Greater Antilles; Texas	
Juan †	$1.5	<$8.0	1985	Category 1 hurricane	United States Gulf Coast	
Bob	$1.5	<$8.0	1991	Category 3 hurricane	United States East Coast; Canada	
Roxanne	$1.5	<$8.0	1995	Category 3 hurricane	Mexico	
Ingrid	$1.5	<$8.0	2013	Category 1 hurricane	Mexico	
Betsy	$1.4	<$8.0	1965	Category 4 hurricane	Louisiana; South Florida; Caribbean	
Camille	$1.4	$58.16	1969	Category 5 hurricane	Mississippi; Louisiana; Alabama; Virginia; Cuba	
Iota	$1.4	data not available	2020	Category 4 hurricane	Colombia; Central America	
Elena	$1.3	<$8.0	1985	Category 3 hurricane	Cuba; United States Gulf Coast	
Isidore	$1.3	<$8.0	2002	Category 3 hurricane	Cuba; Yucatán Peninsula; Louisiana	
Francine†	$1.3	data not available	2024	Category 2 hurricane	Eastern Mexico; Gulf Coast of the United States	
Fred †	$1.3	data not available	2021	Tropical storm	Puerto Rico; Hispaniola; Cuba; Jamaica; Southeastern United States	
Rafael †	$1.3	data not available	2024	Category 3 hurricane	Panama; Costa Rica; Colombia; Jamaica; Cayman Islands; Cuba	
Hanna †	$1.2	data not available	2020	Category 1 hurricane	Hispaniola; Cuba; Gulf Coast of the United States; Mexico	
Elsa †	$1.2	data not available	2021	Category 1 hurricane	Lesser Antilles; Greater Antilles; Venezuela; Colombia; East Coast of the United States; Atlantic Canada	
Lili	$1.2	<$8.0	2002	Category 4 hurricane	Lesser Antilles; Greater Antilles; Gulf Coast of the United States	
Nicholas †	$1.1	data not available	2021	Category 1 hurricane	Mexico; Gulf Coast of the United States	
Nicole †	$1.0	data not available	2022	Category 1 hurricane	Puerto Rico; Dominican Republic; Bahamas; South Atlantic states	
Alberto †	$1.0	<$8.0	1994	Tropical storm	Southeastern United States	
Bonnie †	$1.0	<$8.0	1998	Category 3 hurricane	Lesser Antilles; East Coast of the United States	

== See also ==
- List of costliest tropical cyclones
- List of the deadliest tropical cyclones
- List of the most intense tropical cyclones
