= 1936 in Mexico =

- Decades: 1910s; 1920s; 1930s; 1940s; 1950s
- See also: History of Mexico; List of years in Mexico; Timeline of Mexican history

Events in the year 1936 in Mexico.

== Incumbents ==
=== Federal government ===
- President: Lázaro Cárdenas
- Interior Secretary (SEGOB): Silvestre Guerrero
- Secretary of Foreign Affairs (SRE): Eduardo Hay
- Communications Secretary (SCT): Francisco J. Múgica
- Education Secretary (SEP): Gonzalo Vázquez Vela
- Secretary of Defense (SEDENA): Manuel Ávila Camacho

=== Supreme Court ===
- President of the Supreme Court: Daniel V. Valencia

=== Governors ===
- Aguascalientes: Enrique Osorio Camarena/Juan G. Alvarado Lavallade
- Campeche: Eduardo Mena Córdova
- Chiapas: Victórico R. Grajales/Efraín A. Gutiérrez
- Chihuahua: Rodrigo M. Quevedo
- Coahuila: Jesús Valdez Sánchez
- Colima: Miguel G. Santa Ana
- Durango: Enrique R. Calderón
- Guanajuato: José Inocente Lugo
- Guerrero: José Inocente Lugo
- Hidalgo: Ernesto Viveros
- Jalisco: Everardo Topete
- State of Mexico: Eucario López
- Michoacán: Rafael Ordorica/Gildardo Magaña
- Morelos: José Refugio Bustamante
- Nayarit: Joaquín Cardoso
- Nuevo León: Gregorio Morales Sánchez/Anacleto Guerrero Guajardo
- Oaxaca: Anastasio García Toledo/Constantino Chapital
- Puebla: Gustavo Ariza
- Querétaro: Ramón Rodríguez Familiar
- San Luis Potosí: Mateo Fernández Netro
- Sinaloa: Manuel Páez
- Sonora: Ramón Ramos
- Tabasco: Víctor Fernández Manero
- Tamaulipas: Enrique Canseco
- Tlaxcala: Adolfo Bonilla
- Veracruz: Miguel Alemán Valdés
- Yucatán: Fernando Cárdenas/Florencio Palomo Valencia
- Zacatecas: Matías Ramos

== Popular culture ==
=== Sports ===
- Mexico wins a total of three bronze medals at the Summer Olympics.

=== Film ===
- Allá en el Rancho Grande, directed by Fernando de Fuentes and starring Tito Guízar and Esther Fernández; beginning of the Golden Age of Mexican cinema

== Births ==
- 6 January – Rubén Amaro Sr., Mexican professional baseball player (d. 2017)
- 23 February — Manuel Bartlett, politician (PRI)
- 8 March – Mario Hernández, film director and screenwriter
- 15 April – José Becerra, boxer
- 23 April — Víctor Cervera Pacheco, politician (PRI); Governor of Yucatán 1984–1988 and 1995–2001 (d. 2004)
- 8 May – Víctor Yturbe, singer (died 1987)
- 19 September – Juliana González Valenzuela, Mexican philosopher
- 8 October – Rogelio Guerra, actor (d. 2018)
- 27 October – Enrique Canales, technologist, editor, political analyst, painter, and sculptor (died 2007)
- Date unknown
  - Mario Stern, composer and académic (d. 2017).

== Deaths ==
- 19 May – Pascual Díaz y Barreto, Archbishop of Mexico City (born 1876; colitis)
