= 1933 in Mexico =

- Decades: 1910s; 1920s; 1930s; 1940s; 1950s
- See also: History of Mexico; List of years in Mexico; Timeline of Mexican history

Events in the year 1933 in Mexico.

== Incumbents ==
=== Federal government ===
- President: Abelardo L. Rodríguez
- Interior Secretary (SEGOB): Eduardo Vasconcelos
- Secretary of Foreign Affairs (SRE): José Manuel Puig Casauranc
- Communications Secretary (SCT): Miguel M. Acosta Guajardo
- Education Secretary (SEP): Narciso Bassols
- Secretary of Defense (SEDENA):

=== Supreme Court ===
- President of the Supreme Court:

=== Governors ===
- Aguascalientes: Enrique Osorio Camarena (PNR)
- Campeche: Benjamín Romero Esquivel
- Chiapas: Victórico R. Grajales
- Chihuahua: Rodrigo M. Quevedo
- Coahuila: Salvador Saucedo
  - Nazario S. Ortiz Garza (until October 10)
  - Jesús Valdez Sánchez (from October 10)
- Colima:
- Durango: Carlos Real Félix
- Guanajuato: Melchor Ortega
- Guerrero:
  - Adrián Castrejón
  - Gabriel R. Guevara
- Hidalgo:
  - Bartolomé Vargas Lugo
  - Ernesto Viveros
- Jalisco:
- State of Mexico
  - Filiberto Gómez (PNR, 1929–1933)
  - José Luis Solórzano, (PNR, 1933–1935)
- Michoacán: Dámaso Cárdenas
- Morelos: Vicente Estrada Cajigal (Socialist Revolutionary Party of Morelos, PSRM)
- Nayarit
  - Luis Castillo Ledón, Constitutional governor (1930–1933)
  - Rafael Ibarra Trujillo, Interim governor (1931)
  - Juventino Espinoza Sánchez, Interim governor (1933)
  - Gustavo B. Azcárraga, Interim governor (1933)
- Nuevo León:
  - Francisco A. Cárdenas
  - Pablo Quiroga
- Oaxaca: Anastasio García Toledo
- Puebla
  - Juan Crisóstomo Bonilla (PNR, 1933–1937)
  - José Mijares Palencia (1933)
  - Gustavo Ariza (1933–1937)
- Querétaro: Saturnino Osornio
- San Luis Potosí: Ildefonso Turrubiartes
- Sinaloa: Manuel Páez
- Sonora: Rodolfo Elías Calles (PNR)
- Tabasco: Tomás Garrido Canabal (PRST)
- Tamaulipas: Albino Hernández (interim)
- Tlaxcala: Adolfo Bonilla (PNR)
- Veracruz: Gonzalo Vázquez Vela (PNR)
- Yucatán: Bartolomé García Correa (PNR)
- Zacatecas: Matías Ramos (PNR)

== Events ==
- August 4 – 1933 Florida–Mexico hurricane: Having passed over Florida, the storm regains hurricane status on August 4, a day before striking northern Mexico with winds of 90 mph. It damages buildings and crops in Tamaulipas, while heavy rains lead to flooding that kills at least 31 people, particularly affecting the city of Monterrey.
- September 5 – The Mexican Stock Exchange is established.

== Popular culture ==
=== Sports ===
- See
  - 1933–34 in Mexican football
  - 1933–34 in Mexican football

=== Music ===
- Carlos Chávez:
  - Sinfonía de Antígona
  - Soli I

=== Film ===
- El vuelo de la muerte, starring Sara García

=== Literature ===
- Walter Krickeberg – Los totonaca contribución a la etnografía histórica de la América Central (translation of German work)

== Notable births ==
- May 10 – Antonio González Orozco, muralist (died 2020)
- July 4 – La Prieta Linda, singer and actress (died 2021)
- October 12 – Florencio Olvera Ochoa, bishop (died 2020)

== Notable deaths ==
- November 18 - Francisco Javier Gaxiola, diplomat, lawyer and politician (born 1870)
