= 1938 in Mexico =

- Decades: 1910s; 1920s; 1930s; 1940s; 1950s
- See also: History of Mexico; List of years in Mexico; Timeline of Mexican history

Events in the year 1938 in Mexico.

== Incumbents ==
=== Federal government ===
- President: Lázaro Cárdenas
- Interior Secretary (SEGOB): Silvestre Guerrero; Ignacio García Téllez
- Secretary of Foreign Affairs (SRE): Eduardo Hay
- Communications Secretary (SCT): Francisco J. Múgica
- Education Secretary (SEP): Gonzalo Vázquez Vela
- Secretary of Defense (SEDENA): Manuel Ávila Camacho

=== Supreme Court ===
- President of the Supreme Court: Daniel V. Valencia

=== Governors ===
- Aguascalientes: Enrique Osorio Camarena/Juan G. Alvarado Lavallade
- Campeche: Eduardo Mena Córdova
- Chiapas: Victórico R. Grajales/Efraín A. Gutiérrez
- Chihuahua: Rodrigo M. Quevedo
- Coahuila: Jesús Valdez Sánchez
- Colima: Miguel G. Santa Ana
- Durango: Enrique R. Calderón
- Guanajuato: José Inocente Lugo
- Guerrero: José Inocente Lugo
- Hidalgo: Ernesto Viveros
- Jalisco: Everardo Topete
- State of Mexico: Eucario López
- Michoacán: Rafael Ordorica/Gildardo Magaña
- Morelos: José Refugio Bustamante
- Nayarit: Joaquín Cardoso
- Nuevo León: Gregorio Morales Sánchez/Anacleto Guerrero Guajardo
- Oaxaca: Anastasio García Toledo/Constantino Chapital
- Puebla: Gustavo Ariza
- Querétaro: Ramón Rodríguez Familiar
- San Luis Potosí: Mateo Fernández Netro
- Sinaloa: Manuel Páez
- Sonora: Ramón Ramos
- Tabasco: Víctor Fernández Manero
- Tamaulipas: Enrique Canseco
- Tlaxcala: Adolfo Bonilla
- Veracruz: Miguel Alemán Valdés
- Yucatán: Florencio Palomo Valencia/Humberto Canto Echeverría
- Zacatecas: Matías Ramos

== Events ==
- March 18 – Mexico nationalizes all foreign-owned oil properties within its borders.

== Popular culture ==
=== Sports ===
- 1938–39 Primera Fuerza season

=== Film ===
- Beautiful Mexico, musical directed by and starring Ramón Pereda, with Adriana Lamar and Antonio R. Frausto

=== Literature ===
- José Rubén Romero — La vida inútil de Pito Pérez

== Births ==
- 12 February — Pilar Pellicer, actress (d. 2020)
- 4 May — Carlos Monsiváis, philosopher (d. 2010)
- 20 August
  - Jacqueline Andere, actress
  - Irma González, wrestler

== Deaths ==
- 19 October – Niño Fidencio, Roman Catholic priest and saint (b. 1898)
