= 1934 in Mexico =

- Decades: 1910s; 1920s; 1930s; 1940s; 1950s
- See also: History of Mexico; List of years in Mexico; Timeline of Mexican history

Events in the year 1934 in Mexico.

== Historical Context and Key Events ==
- Flag Adoption: On February 5, 1934, Mexico adopted the bandera militar, a new national flag design which remained in use until 1968. This change reflected Mexico's evolving national identity and military heritage.
- Presidential Transition: On November 30, 1934, Lázaro Cárdenas assumed the presidency from Abelardo L. Rodríguez, following a successful federal election. Cárdenas' presidency marked the beginning of significant social and economic reforms in Mexico.

== Popular Culture and Notable Figures ==
- Film and Literature: The year saw the release of influential Mexican films such as Dos monjes, Janitzio, and Mujeres sin alma. These films contributed to the development of Mexican cinema during the Golden Age of Mexican cinema.
- Notable Births:
  - Cuauhtémoc Cárdenas (May 1) - A key political figure and founder of the Party of the Democratic Revolution, shaping Mexican politics in subsequent decades.
  - Rius (June 20) - Renowned political cartoonist and writer, influential in Mexican satire and socio-political commentary.
  - Beatriz Sheridan (June 25) - Prominent actress and director, known for her contributions to Mexican theater and television.

== Incumbents ==
=== Federal government ===
- President: Abelardo L. Rodríguez (until November 30), Lázaro Cárdenas (starting December 1)
- Interior Secretary (SEGOB): Juan Rios then Eduardo Vasconcelos then Narciso Bassols then Juan D. Cabral then Juan de Dios Bojorquez
- Secretary of Foreign Affairs (SRE): Emilio Portes Gil then Eduardo Hay
- Communications Secretary (SCT): Miguel M. Acosta Guajardo then Rodolfo Elias Calles
- Education Secretary (SEP): Narciso Bassols then Eduardo Vasconcelos then Ignacio Garcia Tellez
- Secretary of Defense (SEDENA): Pablo Quiroga Escamilla

=== Supreme Court ===
- President of the Supreme Court: Francisco H. Ruiz then Daniel V. Valencia

=== Governors ===
- Aguascalientes: Juan G. Alvarado Lavallade
- Campeche: Eduardo Mena Córdova
- Chiapas: Victórico R. Grajales
- Chihuahua: Rodrigo M. Quevedo
- Coahuila: Jesús Valdez Sánchez
- Colima: Miguel G. Santa Ana
- Durango: Enrique R. Calderón
- Guanajuato: José Inocente Lugo
- Guerrero: José Inocente Lugo
- Hidalgo: Ernesto Viveros
- Jalisco: Everardo Topete
- State of Mexico: Eucario López
- Michoacán: Rafael Ordorica
- Morelos: José Refugio Bustamante
- Nayarit: Joaquín Cardoso
- Nuevo León: Gregorio Morales Sánchez
- Oaxaca: Anastasio García Toledo
- Puebla: Gustavo Ariza
- Querétaro: Ramón Rodríguez Familiar
- San Luis Potosí: Mateo Fernández Netro
- Sinaloa: Manuel Páez
- Sonora: Ramón Ramos
- Tabasco: Víctor Fernández Manero
- Tamaulipas: Enrique Canseco
- Tlaxcala: Adolfo Bonilla
- Veracruz: Miguel Alemán Valdés
- Yucatán: Fernando Cárdenas
- Zacatecas: Matías Ramos

== Events ==
Bandera militar 1916–1934 flag

1934–1968 flag

- February 5 – the bandera militar flag of Mexico is adopted.
- November 30 – Lázaro Cárdenas becomes president of Mexico after winning the federal elections.

== Popular culture ==
=== Film ===
- Dos monjes
- Janitzio
- Mujeres sin alma

== Notable births ==
- February 7 – Juan Corona, serial killer (d. 2019)
- February 17 — Salvador Flores Huerta, Mexican Roman Catholic prelate, Bishop of Ciudad Lázaro Cárdenas (1993–2006) (d. 2018).
- March 28 – Sixto Valencia Burgos, caricaturist
- May 1 – Cuauhtémoc Cárdenas, politician, founder of the Party of the Democratic Revolution (d. 2026)
- May 4 — Humberto Lugo Gil, Governor of Hidalgo 1998–1999 (d. 2013)
- June 15 – Rubén Aguirre, television actor
- June 20 — Rius (Eduardo Humberto del Río García), political cartoonist and writer (d. 2017)
- June 25 – Beatriz Sheridan, Mexican actress, director (d. 2006)
- July 22 — Eric del Castillo, actor
- September 21 — Maria Rubio, actress (d. 2018).
- December 12
  - Leopoldo Flores, artist, member of the Salón de la Plástica Mexicana (d. April 3, 1934).
  - Miguel de la Madrid Hurtado, president of Mexico (1982–1988)
  - Guadalupe Robledo (José Lothario), wrestler and manager (NWA, WWE, CWF).(d. 2018)
