= List of United States hurricanes =

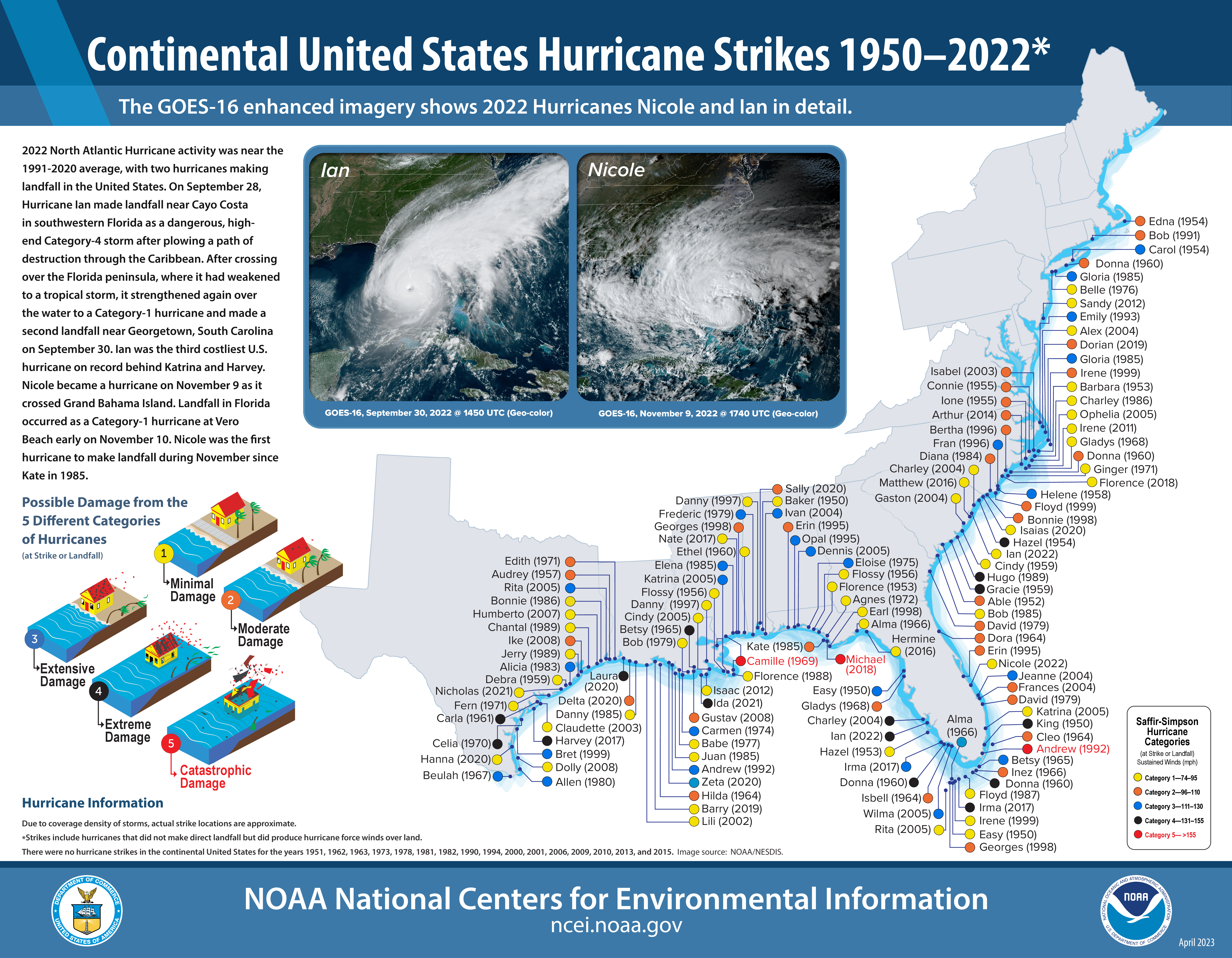
Continental United States hurricane strikes 1950–2022

The list of United States hurricanes includes all tropical cyclones officially recorded to have produced sustained winds of greater than 74 mph (119 km/h) in the United States, which is the minimum threshold for hurricane intensity. The list, which is sorted by U.S. state, begins in 1851 with the start of the official Atlantic hurricane database (HURDAT), as provided by the National Oceanic and Atmospheric Administration's Hurricane Research Division. Since 1851, a total of 306 North Atlantic hurricanes produced hurricane-force winds in 19 states along the Atlantic coast. Some of these storms may not have made a direct landfall (i.e. remained just offshore) while producing hurricane-force winds on land; some of them may have weakened to a tropical storm or became extratropical before landfall but produced hurricane conditions on land while still a hurricane and some of them made landfall in an adjacent state but produced hurricane conditions over multiple states. This list does not include storms that only produced tropical storm conditions on land in the United States.

Additionally, six Pacific hurricanes struck Hawaii, and one Pacific tropical cyclone brought hurricane-force winds to California. The tables list hurricanes by category on the Saffir–Simpson scale, based on winds that occurred in each state.

== Statistics ==

Map of the United States; click on individual states to be directed to its article,
or click on some coastal states to be directed to a list of tropical cyclones in those locations

As of 2026, a total of 306 Atlantic hurricanes have produced hurricane-force winds in every state along the Atlantic Ocean and Gulf of Mexico (as well as Pennsylvania), with Florida having had more hurricanes affecting it than any other state.

The earliest time in the year for a hurricane (and a major hurricane) to strike the nation was June 9, which was set by Alma in 1966. The earliest major hurricane (category 3 or greater) to make an actual landfall in the nation occurred in 1957, when Hurricane Audrey made landfall at category 3 intensity on June 27. The latest in the year for a hurricane to strike the nation was on November 24 with Hurricane Iwa in Hawaii; for the Atlantic basin the latest was on November 22, which was set by Hurricane Kate in 1985. The latest in the year for a major hurricane to strike the nation was from Hurricane Zeta, which moved ashore on October 28.

The 1990s were the most active decade for the United States, with a total of 31 hurricanes affecting the nation. By contrast, the least active decade was the 1970s, with a total of only 14 hurricanes affecting the United States. A total of 34 seasons on record passed without an Atlantic hurricane affecting the country — the most recent of which was the 2025 season. Seven Atlantic hurricanes affected the country in the 1886 season, which was the year with the most United States hurricanes.

== Impact ==
The 1935 Labor Day hurricane was the most intense hurricane to make landfall on the country, having struck the Florida Keys with a pressure of 892 mbar. It was one of only seven hurricanes to move ashore as a Category 5 hurricane on the Saffir–Simpson hurricane scale; the others were "Okeechobee" in 1928, Karen in 1962, Camille in 1969, Andrew in 1992, Michael in 2018, and Yutu in 2018, which had landfall pressures of 931 mbar, 932 mbar, 900 mbar, 922 mbar, 919 mbar, and 900 mbar, respectively. Hurricane Michael in 2018 was the fourth most intense hurricane to strike the country with a pressure of 919 mbar, while hurricanes Katrina in 2005 and Maria in 2017 are tied as the fifth most intense hurricanes to strike the country, each with a pressure of 920 mbar.

The 1900 Galveston hurricane was the deadliest hurricane in the history of the United States, killing between 6,000 and 12,000 people. 2017s Hurricane Maria resulted in at least 2,982 fatalities. The 1928 Okeechobee hurricane caused at least 2,500 fatalities, and in 2005, Hurricane Katrina killed approximately 1,800 people. In the 1893 season, two hurricanes each caused over 1,000 deaths.

Not accounting for inflation, a total of twenty Atlantic hurricanes have resulted in over US$10 billion in damage, including three each from the 2004, 2005, and 2017 seasons, respectively. The costliest hurricanes were Katrina in 2005 and Harvey in 2017, both with uninflated damage totals amounting to US$125 billion.

== List of states ==
The category listed for each state indicates the maximum category of sustained winds that were recorded or analyzed to have occurred in that state. It is not necessarily the category of the storm at the time of landfall or closest approach (if the strongest winds were occurring elsewhere or only over water at the time).

=== Alabama ===
| Name | Saffir–Simpson Category | Date of closest approach | Year |
|---|---|---|---|
| Unnamed | Category 3 hurricane | August 26 | 1852 |
| Unnamed | Category 1 hurricane (Note: Hurricane conditions in this state were limited to inland areas.) | August 31 | 1856 |
| Unnamed | Category 1 hurricane | September 16 | 1859 |
| Unnamed | Category 2 hurricane | August 12 | 1860 |
| Unnamed | Category 1 hurricane | September 16 | 1860 |
| Unnamed | Category 1 hurricane | July 30 | 1870 |
| Unnamed | Category 1 hurricane | September 10 | 1882 |
| Unnamed | Category 2 hurricane | October 3 | 1893 |
| Unnamed | Category 1 hurricane | August 15 | 1901 |
| Unnamed | Category 2 hurricane | September 27 | 1906 |
| Unnamed | Category 1 hurricane | September 14 | 1912 |
| Unnamed | Category 2 hurricane | July 5 | 1916 |
| Unnamed | Category 2 hurricane | October 18 | 1916 |
| Unnamed | Category 1 hurricane | September 29 | 1917 |
| Unnamed | Category 3 hurricane | August 21 | 1926 |
| Unnamed | Category 1 hurricane | September 1 | 1932 |
| Baker | Category 1 hurricane | August 31 | 1950 |
| Camille | Category 1 hurricane (Note: This hurricane did not make landfall, but produced hurricane conditions over the state indicated.) | August 18 | 1969 |
| Eloise | Category 1 hurricane | September 23 | 1975 |
| Frederic | Category 4 hurricane | September 13 | 1979 |
| Elena | Category 3 hurricane | September 2 | 1985 |
| Opal | Category 1 hurricane | October 4 | 1995 |
| Danny | Category 1 hurricane | July 19 | 1997 |
| Ivan | Category 3 hurricane | September 16 | 2004 |
| Dennis | Category 1 hurricane | July 10 | 2005 |
| Katrina | Category 1 hurricane | August 29 | 2005 |
| Michael | Category 1 hurricane | October 10 | 2018 |
| Sally | Category 2 hurricane | September 16 | 2020 |
| Zeta | Category 1 hurricane | October 29 | 2020 |
Sources: Chronological List of All Hurricanes which Affected the Continental United States; Documentation of Atlantic Tropical Cyclones Changes in HURDAT

=== Connecticut ===
| Name | Saffir–Simpson Category | Date of closest approach | Year |
|---|---|---|---|
| Unnamed | Category 1 hurricane | September 16 | 1858 |
| Unnamed | Category 1 hurricane | September 8 | 1869 |
| Unnamed | Category 1 hurricane | August 24 | 1893 |
| Unnamed | Category 1 hurricane | October 10 | 1894 |
| Unnamed | Category 3 hurricane | September 21 | 1938 |
| Unnamed | Category 1 hurricane | September 15 | 1944 |
| Carol | Category 3 hurricane | August 31 | 1954 |
| Donna | Category 1 hurricane | September 12 | 1960 |
| Gloria | Category 1 hurricane | September 27 | 1985 |
| Bob | Category 2 hurricane | August 19 | 1991 |
Source: Chronological List of All Hurricanes which Affected the Continental United States

=== Delaware ===
| Name | Saffir–Simpson Category | Date of closest approach | Year |
|---|---|---|---|
| Unnamed | Category 2 hurricane | October 23 | 1878 |
| Unnamed | Category 1 hurricane | September 16 | 1903 |
Source: Chronological List of All Hurricanes which Affected the Continental United States

=== Florida ===
| Name | Saffir–Simpson Category | Date of closest approach | Year |
|---|---|---|---|
| Unnamed | Category 3 hurricane | August 23 | 1851 |
| Unnamed | Category 1 hurricane | August 26 | 1852 |
| Unnamed | Category 1 hurricane | September 12 | 1852 |
| Unnamed | Category 2 hurricane | October 9 | 1852 |
| Unnamed | Category 1 hurricane | September 8 | 1854 |
| Unnamed | Category 2 hurricane | August 31 | 1856 |
| Unnamed | Category 1 hurricane | September 16 | 1859 |
| Unnamed | Category 1 hurricane | October 28 | 1859 |
| Unnamed | Category 1 hurricane | August 16 | 1861 |
| Unnamed | Category 2 hurricane | October 23 | 1865 |
| Unnamed | Category 1 hurricane | October 6 | 1867 |
| Unnamed | Category 1 hurricane | October 9 | 1870 |
| Unnamed | Category 1 hurricane | October 20 | 1870 |
| Unnamed | Category 3 hurricane | August 16 | 1871 |
| Unnamed | Category 2 hurricane | August 25 | 1871 |
| Unnamed | Category 1 hurricane | September 6 | 1871 |
| Unnamed | Category 3 hurricane | October 7 | 1873 |
| Unnamed | Category 1 hurricane | September 19 | 1873 |
| Unnamed | Category 1 hurricane | September 28 | 1874 |
| Unnamed | Category 2 hurricane | October 20 | 1876 |
| Unnamed | Category 1 hurricane | September 19 | 1877 |
| Unnamed | Category 3 hurricane | October 3 | 1877 |
| Unnamed | Category 2 hurricane | September 10 | 1878 |
| Unnamed | Category 2 hurricane | August 29 | 1880 |
| Unnamed | Category 1 hurricane | October 8 | 1880 |
| Unnamed | Category 3 hurricane | September 10 | 1882 |
| Unnamed | Category 1 hurricane | October 11 | 1882 |
| Unnamed | Category 1 hurricane | August 24 | 1885 |
| Unnamed | Category 2 hurricane | June 21 | 1886 |
| Unnamed | Category 2 hurricane | June 30 | 1886 |
| Unnamed | Category 1 hurricane | July 18 | 1886 |
| Unnamed | Category 1 hurricane | July 27 | 1887 |
| Unnamed | Category 3 hurricane | August 16 | 1888 |
| Unnamed | Category 2 hurricane | October 11 | 1888 |
| Unnamed | Category 1 hurricane | August 24 | 1891 |
| Unnamed | Category 1 hurricane | August 27 | 1893 |
| Unnamed | Category 2 hurricane | September 25 | 1894 |
| Unnamed | Category 3 hurricane | October 9 | 1894 |
| Unnamed | Category 2 hurricane | July 7 | 1896 |
| Unnamed | Category 3 hurricane | September 29 | 1896 |
| Unnamed | Category 1 hurricane | August 3 | 1898 |
| Unnamed | Category 2 hurricane | October 2 | 1898 |
| Unnamed | Category 2 hurricane | August 1 | 1899 |
| Unnamed | Category 1 hurricane | August 11 | 1903 |
| Unnamed | Category 1 hurricane | October 17 | 1904 |
| Unnamed | Category 1 hurricane | June 16 | 1906 |
| Unnamed | Category 2 hurricane | September 27 | 1906 |
| Unnamed | Category 3 hurricane | October 18 | 1906 |
| Unnamed | Category 3 hurricane | October 11 | 1909 |
| Unnamed | Category 2 hurricane | October 18 | 1910 |
| Unnamed | Category 1 hurricane | August 11 | 1911 |
| Unnamed | Category 1 hurricane | September 14 | 1912 |
| Unnamed | Category 1 hurricane | August 1 | 1915 |
| Unnamed | Category 1 hurricane | September 4 | 1915 |
| Unnamed | Category 2 hurricane | July 5 | 1916 |
| Unnamed | Category 2 hurricane | October 18 | 1916 |
| Unnamed | Category 3 hurricane | September 29 | 1917 |
| Unnamed | Category 4 hurricane | September 10 | 1919 |
| Unnamed | Category 4 hurricane | October 25 | 1921 |
| Unnamed | Category 1 hurricane | September 15 | 1924 |
| Unnamed | Category 1 hurricane | October 21 | 1924 |
| Unnamed | Category 2 hurricane | July 27 | 1926 |
| Unnamed | Category 4 hurricane | September 18 | 1926 |
| Unnamed | Category 1 hurricane | October 21 | 1926 |
| Unnamed | Category 2 hurricane | August 8 | 1928 |
| Unnamed | Category 4 hurricane | September 17 | 1928 |
| Unnamed | Category 3 hurricane | September 28 | 1929 |
| Unnamed | Category 1 hurricane | September 1 | 1932 |
| Unnamed | Category 1 hurricane | July 30 | 1933 |
| Unnamed | Category 3 hurricane | September 4 | 1933 |
| Unnamed | Category 5 hurricane | September 3 | 1935 |
| Unnamed | Category 2 hurricane | November 4 | 1935 |
| Unnamed | Category 2 hurricane | July 31 | 1936 |
| Unnamed | Category 1 hurricane | August 11 | 1939 |
| Unnamed | Category 2 hurricane | October 6 | 1941 |
| Unnamed | Category 4 hurricane | October 19 | 1944 |
| Unnamed | Category 1 hurricane | June 24 | 1945 |
| Unnamed | Category 3 hurricane | September 15 | 1945 |
| Unnamed | Category 1 hurricane | October 8 | 1946 |
| Unnamed | Category 4 hurricane | September 17 | 1947 |
| Unnamed | Category 1 hurricane | October 11 | 1947 |
| Unnamed | Category 4 hurricane | September 21 | 1948 |
| Unnamed | Category 2 hurricane | October 5 | 1948 |
| Unnamed | Category 4 hurricane | August 26 | 1949 |
| Easy | Category 3 hurricane | September 5 | 1950 |
| King | Category 4 hurricane | October 18 | 1950 |
| Florence | Category 1 hurricane | September 26 | 1953 |
| Hazel | Category 1 hurricane | October 9 | 1953 |
| Flossy | Category 1 hurricane | September 24 | 1956 |
| Donna | Category 4 hurricane | September 10 | 1960 |
| Cleo | Category 2 hurricane | August 27 | 1964 |
| Dora | Category 2 hurricane | September 10 | 1964 |
| Isbell | Category 2 hurricane | October 14 | 1964 |
| Betsy | Category 3 hurricane | September 8 | 1965 |
| Alma | Category 3 hurricane (Note: This hurricane did not make landfall at this intensity, but produced such conditions over the state indicated. It eventually made landfall as a weaker hurricane.) | June 9 | 1966 |
| Inez | Category 2 hurricane | October 8 | 1966 |
| Gladys | Category 2 hurricane | October 19 | 1968 |
| Agnes | Category 1 hurricane | June 19 | 1972 |
| Eloise | Category 3 hurricane | September 23 | 1975 |
| David | Category 2 hurricane | September 3 | 1979 |
| Elena | Category 3 hurricane | September 1 | 1985 |
| Kate | Category 2 hurricane | November 21 | 1985 |
| Floyd | Category 1 hurricane | October 12 | 1987 |
| Andrew | Category 5 hurricane | August 24 | 1992 |
| Erin | Category 2 hurricane | August 3 | 1995 |
| Opal | Category 3 hurricane | October 4 | 1995 |
| Earl | Category 1 hurricane | September 3 | 1998 |
| Georges | Category 2 hurricane | September 25 | 1998 |
| Irene | Category 1 hurricane | October 15 | 1999 |
| Charley | Category 4 hurricane | August 13 | 2004 |
| Frances | Category 2 hurricane | September 5 | 2004 |
| Ivan | Category 3 hurricane | September 16 | 2004 |
| Jeanne | Category 3 hurricane | September 26 | 2004 |
| Dennis | Category 3 hurricane | July 10 | 2005 |
| Katrina | Category 1 hurricane | August 25 | 2005 |
| Rita | Category 1 hurricane | September 20 | 2005 |
| Wilma | Category 3 hurricane | October 24 | 2005 |
| Hermine | Category 1 hurricane | September 2 | 2016 |
| Matthew | Category 2 hurricane | October 7 | 2016 |
| Irma | Category 4 hurricane | September 10 | 2017 |
| Michael | Category 5 hurricane | October 10 | 2018 |
| Sally | Category 2 hurricane | September 16 | 2020 |
| Ian | Category 4 hurricane | September 28 | 2022 |
| Idalia | Category 3 hurricane | August 30 | 2023 |
| Debby | Category 1 hurricane | August 5 | 2024 |
| Helene | Category 4 hurricane | September 27 | 2024 |
| Milton | Category 2 hurricane (Note: Made landfall as a Category 3, but only produced Category 2 conditions in this state.) | October 10 | 2024 |
| Isaias | Category 2 hurricane | October 9 | 2026 |
Source: Chronological List of All Hurricanes which Affected the Continental United States

=== Georgia ===
| Name | Saffir–Simpson Category | Date of closest approach | Year |
|---|---|---|---|
| Unnamed | Category 1 hurricane | August 24 | 1851 |
| Unnamed | Category 1 hurricane | October 10 | 1852 |
| Unnamed | Category 1 hurricane | October 21 | 1853 |
| Unnamed | Category 3 hurricane | September 8 | 1854 |
| Unnamed | Category 1 hurricane | August 31 | 1856 |
| Unnamed | Category 1 hurricane | October 3 | 1877 |
| Unnamed | Category 1 hurricane | September 11 | 1878 |
| Unnamed | Category 2 hurricane | August 28 | 1881 |
| Unnamed | Category 1 hurricane | August 25 | 1885 |
| Unnamed | Category 1 hurricane | June 21 | 1886 |
| Unnamed | Category 1 hurricane | June 30 | 1886 |
| Unnamed | Category 3 hurricane | August 28 | 1893 |
| Unnamed | Category 1 hurricane | October 9 | 1894 |
| Unnamed | Category 2 hurricane | September 29 | 1896 |
| Unnamed | Category 1 hurricane | August 31 | 1898 |
| Unnamed | Category 4 hurricane | October 2 | 1898 |
| Unnamed | Category 1 hurricane | August 28 | 1911 |
| Unnamed | Category 1 hurricane | September 18 | 1928 |
| "Labor Day" | Category 1 hurricane | September 5 | 1935 |
| Unnamed | Category 1 hurricane | August 11 | 1940 |
| Unnamed | Category 2 hurricane | October 15 | 1947 |
| Unnamed | Category 1 hurricane | August 27 | 1949 |
| David | Category 2 hurricane | September 4 | 1979 |
| Kate | Category 1 hurricane | November 22 | 1985 |
| Matthew | Category 1 hurricane | October 8 | 2016 |
| Michael | Category 2 hurricane | October 10 | 2018 |
| Idalia | Category 1 hurricane | August 30 | 2023 |
| Helene | Category 2 hurricane | September 27 | 2024 |
Sources: Chronological List of All Hurricanes which Affected the Continental United States; Documentation of Atlantic Tropical Cyclones Changes in HURDAT

=== Louisiana ===
| Name | Saffir–Simpson Category | Date of closest approach | Year |
|---|---|---|---|
| Unnamed | Category 2 hurricane | August 25 | 1852 |
| Unnamed | Category 3 hurricane | September 16 | 1855 |
| Unnamed | Category 4 hurricane | August 11 | 1856 |
| Unnamed | Category 3 hurricane | August 11 | 1860 |
| Unnamed | Category 2 hurricane | September 15 | 1860 |
| Unnamed | Category 2 hurricane | October 2 | 1860 |
| Unnamed | Category 2 hurricane | September 13 | 1865 |
| Unnamed | Category 2 hurricane | October 4 | 1867 |
| Unnamed | Category 1 hurricane | September 5 | 1869 |
| Unnamed | Category 1 hurricane | September 18 | 1877 |
| Unnamed | Category 2 hurricane | August 23 | 1879 |
| Unnamed | Category 3 hurricane | September 1 | 1879 |
| Unnamed | Category 2 hurricane | June 14 | 1886 |
| Unnamed | Category 3 hurricane | October 12 | 1886 |
| Unnamed | Category 1 hurricane | October 19 | 1887 |
| Unnamed | Category 2 hurricane | August 19 | 1888 |
| Unnamed | Category 1 hurricane | September 23 | 1889 |
| Unnamed | Category 2 hurricane | September 7 | 1893 |
| Unnamed | Category 4 hurricane | October 2 | 1893 |
| Unnamed | Category 1 hurricane | September 12 | 1897 |
| Unnamed | Category 1 hurricane | August 14 | 1901 |
| Unnamed | Category 1 hurricane | September 27 | 1906 |
| Unnamed | Category 3 hurricane | September 20 | 1909 |
| Unnamed | Category 1 hurricane | August 17 | 1915 |
| Unnamed | Category 3 hurricane | September 29 | 1915 |
| Unnamed | Category 2 hurricane | September 29 | 1917 |
| Unnamed | Category 3 hurricane | August 7 | 1918 |
| Unnamed | Category 2 hurricane | September 21 | 1920 |
| Unnamed | Category 1 hurricane | October 16 | 1923 |
| Unnamed | Category 3 hurricane | August 26 | 1926 |
| Unnamed | Category 2 hurricane | June 16 | 1934 |
| Unnamed | Category 1 hurricane | August 15 | 1938 |
| Unnamed | Category 2 hurricane | August 7 | 1940 |
| Unnamed | Category 2 hurricane | September 19 | 1947 |
| Unnamed | Category 1 hurricane | September 4 | 1948 |
| Flossy | Category 2 hurricane | September 24 | 1956 |
| Audrey | Category 3 hurricane | June 27 | 1957 |
| Ethel | Category 1 hurricane | September 15 | 1964 |
| Hilda | Category 2 hurricane | October 3 | 1964 |
| Betsy | Category 4 hurricane | September 10 | 1965 |
| Camille | Category 5 hurricane | August 17 | 1969 |
| Edith | Category 1 hurricane | September 16 | 1971 |
| Carmen | Category 3 hurricane | September 8 | 1974 |
| Babe | Category 1 hurricane | September 5 | 1977 |
| Bob | Category 1 hurricane | July 11 | 1979 |
| Danny | Category 1 hurricane | August 15 | 1985 |
| Juan | Category 1 hurricane | October 28 | 1985 |
| Florence | Category 1 hurricane | September 10 | 1988 |
| Andrew | Category 3 hurricane | August 26 | 1992 |
| Danny | Category 1 hurricane | July 18 | 1997 |
| Lili | Category 1 hurricane | October 3 | 2002 |
| Cindy | Category 1 hurricane | July 6 | 2005 |
| Katrina | Category 3 hurricane | August 29 | 2005 |
| Rita | Category 3 hurricane | September 24 | 2005 |
| Humberto | Category 1 hurricane | September 13 | 2007 |
| Gustav | Category 2 hurricane | September 1 | 2008 |
| Isaac | Category 1 hurricane | August 28 | 2012 |
| Nate | Category 1 hurricane | October 7 | 2017 |
| Barry | Category 1 hurricane | July 13 | 2019 |
| Laura | Category 4 hurricane | August 27 | 2020 |
| Delta | Category 2 hurricane | October 9 | 2020 |
| Zeta | Category 3 hurricane | October 28 | 2020 |
| Ida | Category 4 hurricane | August 29 | 2021 |
| Francine | Category 2 hurricane | September 11 | 2024 |
Sources: Chronological List of All Hurricanes which Affected the Continental United States; Documentation of Atlantic Tropical Cyclones Changes in HURDAT

=== Maine ===
| Name | Saffir–Simpson Category | Date of closest approach | Year |
|---|---|---|---|
| Unnamed | Category 2 hurricane | October 4 | 1869 |
| Gloria | Category 1 hurricane | September 27 | 1985 |
Source: Chronological List of All Hurricanes which Affected the Continental United States

=== Maryland ===
| Name | Saffir–Simpson Category | Date of closest approach | Year |
|---|---|---|---|
| Unnamed | Category 1 hurricane | October 23 | 1878 |
| Unnamed | Category 1 hurricane | August 23 | 1933 |
Source: Chronological List of All Hurricanes which Affected the Continental United States

=== Massachusetts ===
| Name | Saffir–Simpson Category | Date of closest approach | Year |
|---|---|---|---|
| Unnamed | Category 1 hurricane | September 16 | 1858 |
| Unnamed | Category 3 hurricane | September 8 | 1869 |
| Unnamed | Category 1 hurricane | October 4 | 1869 |
| Unnamed | Category 1 hurricane | August 19 | 1879 |
| Unnamed | Category 1 hurricane | September 10 | 1896 |
| Unnamed | Category 1 hurricane | August 26 | 1924 |
| Unnamed | Category 2 hurricane | September 21 | 1938 |
| Unnamed | Category 1 hurricane | September 15 | 1944 |
| Carol | Category 2 hurricane | August 31 | 1954 |
| Edna | Category 2 hurricane | September 11 | 1954 |
| Donna | Category 1 hurricane | September 12 | 1960 |
| Bob | Category 2 hurricane | August 19 | 1991 |
Source: Chronological List of All Hurricanes which Affected the Continental United States

=== Mississippi ===
| Name | Saffir–Simpson Category | Date of closest approach | Year |
|---|---|---|---|
| Unnamed | Category 3 hurricane | August 26 | 1852 |
| Unnamed | Category 3 hurricane | August 16 | 1855 |
| Unnamed | Category 3 hurricane | August 12 | 1860 |
| Unnamed | Category 2 hurricane | September 15 | 1860 |
| Unnamed | Category 1 hurricane | August 20 | 1888 |
| Unnamed | Category 2 hurricane | October 2 | 1893 |
| Unnamed | Category 1 hurricane | August 15 | 1901 |
| Unnamed | Category 2 hurricane | September 27 | 1906 |
| Unnamed | Category 2 hurricane | September 21 | 1909 |
| Unnamed | Category 2 hurricane | September 29 | 1915 |
| Unnamed | Category 3 hurricane | July 6 | 1916 |
| Unnamed | Category 1 hurricane | October 16 | 1923 |
| Unnamed | Category 1 hurricane | September 21 | 1926 |
| Unnamed | Category 2 hurricane | September 19 | 1947 |
| Ethel | Category 1 hurricane | September 15 | 1960 |
| Camille | Category 5 hurricane | August 18 | 1969 |
| Frederic | Category 3 hurricane | September 13 | 1979 |
| Elena | Category 3 hurricane | September 2 | 1985 |
| Georges | Category 2 hurricane | September 29 | 1998 |
| Katrina | Category 3 hurricane | August 29 | 2005 |
| Nate | Category 1 hurricane | October 8 | 2017 |
| Zeta | Category 2 hurricane | October 29 | 2020 |
Source: Chronological List of All Hurricanes which Affected the Continental United States

=== New Hampshire ===
| Name | Saffir–Simpson Category | Date of closest approach | Year |
|---|---|---|---|
| Gloria | Category 1 hurricane | September 27 | 1985 |
Source: Chronological List of All Hurricanes which Affected the Continental United States

=== New Jersey ===
Although Hurricane Sandy struck the state in October 2012 and produced hurricane-force winds, it became an extratropical cyclone before landfall or producing any hurricane-strength winds.

| Name | Saffir–Simpson Category | Date of closest approach | Year |
|---|---|---|---|
| Unnamed | Category 1 hurricane | October 23 | 1878 |
| Unnamed | Category 1 hurricane | September 16 | 1903 |
| Unnamed | Category 1 hurricane | September 8 | 1934 |
| Unnamed | Category 1 hurricane | September 14 | 1944 |
Source: Chronological List of All Hurricanes which Affected the Continental United States

=== New York ===
| Name | Saffir–Simpson Category | Date of closest approach | Year |
|---|---|---|---|
| Unnamed | Category 1 hurricane | September 16 | 1858 |
| Unnamed | Category 1 hurricane | September 8 | 1869 |
| Unnamed | Category 1 hurricane | August 24 | 1893 |
| Unnamed | Category 1 hurricane | October 10 | 1894 |
| Unnamed | Category 1 hurricane | September 8 | 1934 |
| Unnamed | Category 3 hurricane | September 21 | 1938 |
| Unnamed | Category 2 hurricane | September 15 | 1944 |
| Carol | Category 3 hurricane | August 31 | 1954 |
| Edna | Category 1 hurricane | September 11 | 1954 |
| Donna | Category 2 hurricane | September 12 | 1960 |
| Belle | Category 1 hurricane | August 10 | 1976 |
| Gloria | Category 1 hurricane | September 27 | 1985 |
| Bob | Category 2 hurricane | August 19 | 1991 |
| Sandy | Category 1 hurricane (Note: This storm became extratropical before landfall, but produced hurricane conditions over the state indicated while still a tropical cyclone.) | October 29 | 2012 |
Source: Chronological List of All Hurricanes which Affected the Continental United States

=== North Carolina ===
| Name | Saffir–Simpson Category | Date of closest approach | Year |
|---|---|---|---|
| Unnamed | Category 1 hurricane | September 13 | 1857 |
| Unnamed | Category 1 hurricane | September 27 | 1861 |
| Unnamed | Category 1 hurricane | November 2 | 1861 |
| Unnamed | Category 1 hurricane | September 24 | 1874 |
| Unnamed | Category 1 hurricane | September 17 | 1876 |
| Unnamed | Category 2 hurricane | October 23 | 1878 |
| Unnamed | Category 3 hurricane | August 18 | 1879 |
| Unnamed | Category 1 hurricane | September 9 | 1880 |
| Unnamed | Category 2 hurricane | September 9 | 1881 |
| Unnamed | Category 2 hurricane | September 11 | 1883 |
| Unnamed | Category 2 hurricane | September 25 | 1885 |
| Unnamed | Category 1 hurricane | August 20 | 1887 |
| Unnamed | Category 1 hurricane | August 28 | 1893 |
| Unnamed | Category 1 hurricane | October 13 | 1893 |
| Unnamed | Category 1 hurricane | September 29 | 1896 |
| Unnamed | Category 3 hurricane | August 18 | 1899 |
| Unnamed | Category 2 hurricane | October 31 | 1899 |
| Unnamed | Category 1 hurricane | July 11 | 1901 |
| Unnamed | Category 1 hurricane | September 17 | 1906 |
| Unnamed | Category 1 hurricane | July 31 | 1908 |
| Unnamed | Category 1 hurricane | September 3 | 1913 |
| Unnamed | Category 1 hurricane | August 24 | 1918 |
| Unnamed | Category 1 hurricane | August 26 | 1924 |
| Unnamed | Category 1 hurricane | August 23 | 1933 |
| Unnamed | Category 2 hurricane | September 16 | 1933 |
| Unnamed | Category 1 hurricane | September 9 | 1934 |
| Unnamed | Category 1 hurricane | September 18 | 1936 |
| Unnamed | Category 1 hurricane | August 1 | 1944 |
| Unnamed | Category 2 hurricane | September 14 | 1944 |
| Unnamed | Category 1 hurricane | August 24 | 1949 |
| Barbara | Category 1 hurricane | August 14 | 1953 |
| Carol | Category 1 hurricane | August 31 | 1954 |
| Edna | Category 1 hurricane | September 11 | 1954 |
| Hazel | Category 4 hurricane | October 15 | 1954 |
| Connie | Category 2 hurricane | August 12 | 1955 |
| Ione | Category 2 hurricane | September 19 | 1955 |
| Helene | Category 3 hurricane | September 27 | 1958 |
| Donna | Category 2 hurricane | September 12 | 1960 |
| Ginger | Category 1 hurricane | September 30 | 1971 |
| Diana | Category 2 hurricane | September 13 | 1984 |
| Gloria | Category 2 hurricane | September 27 | 1985 |
| Charley | Category 1 hurricane | August 17 | 1986 |
| Hugo | Category 1 hurricane | September 22 | 1989 |
| Emily | Category 3 hurricane | August 31 | 1993 |
| Bertha | Category 2 hurricane | July 12 | 1996 |
| Fran | Category 3 hurricane | September 6 | 1996 |
| Bonnie | Category 2 hurricane | August 27 | 1998 |
| Floyd | Category 2 hurricane | September 16 | 1999 |
| Irene | Category 2 hurricane | October 18 | 1999 |
| Isabel | Category 2 hurricane | September 18 | 2003 |
| Alex | Category 1 hurricane | August 3 | 2004 |
| Charley | Category 1 hurricane | August 14 | 2004 |
| Ophelia | Category 1 hurricane | September 14 | 2005 |
| Irene | Category 1 hurricane | August 27 | 2011 |
| Arthur | Category 2 hurricane | July 4 | 2014 |
| Matthew | Category 1 hurricane | October 8 | 2016 |
| Florence | Category 1 hurricane | September 14 | 2018 |
| Dorian | Category 2 hurricane | September 6 | 2019 |
| Isaias | Category 1 hurricane | August 4 | 2020 |
Sources: Chronological List of All Hurricanes which Affected the Continental United States; Documentation of Atlantic Tropical Cyclones Changes in HURDAT

=== Pennsylvania ===
Though not directly bordering the Atlantic Ocean, the Gale of 1878 produced hurricane-force winds in the state, the only tropical cyclone on record to do so. Furthermore, Hurricane Agnes (1972) had a severe impact on the state. Although it had been only a Category 1 storm, and had weakened to a tropical depression by the time it reached Pennsylvania, Hurricane Agnes nevertheless caused severe flooding, as well as enormous economic damage.

=== Rhode Island ===
| Name | Saffir–Simpson Category | Date of closest approach | Year |
|---|---|---|---|
| Unnamed | Category 1 hurricane | September 16 | 1858 |
| Unnamed | Category 1 hurricane | September 8 | 1869 |
| Unnamed | Category 1 hurricane | October 10 | 1894 |
| Unnamed | Category 1 hurricane | September 10 | 1896 |
| Unnamed | Category 3 hurricane | September 21 | 1938 |
| Unnamed | Category 2 hurricane | September 15 | 1944 |
| Carol | Category 3 hurricane | August 31 | 1954 |
| Edna | Category 1 hurricane | September 11 | 1954 |
| Donna | Category 1 hurricane | September 12 | 1960 |
| Bob | Category 2 hurricane | August 19 | 1991 |
Source: Chronological List of All Hurricanes which Affected the Continental United States

=== South Carolina ===
| Name | Saffir–Simpson Category | Date of closest approach | Year |
|---|---|---|---|
| Unnamed | Category 2 hurricane | September 8 | 1854 |
| Unnamed | Category 1 hurricane | June 22 | 1867 |
| Unnamed | Category 1 hurricane | September 28 | 1874 |
| Unnamed | Category 1 hurricane | September 12 | 1878 |
| Unnamed | Category 1 hurricane | August 28 | 1881 |
| Unnamed | Category 1 hurricane | September 11 | 1883 |
| Unnamed | Category 3 hurricane | August 25 | 1885 |
| Unnamed | Category 3 hurricane | August 28 | 1893 |
| Unnamed | Category 3 hurricane | October 13 | 1893 |
| Unnamed | Category 1 hurricane | September 27 | 1894 |
| Unnamed | Category 1 hurricane | September 29 | 1896 |
| Unnamed | Category 1 hurricane | August 31 | 1898 |
| Unnamed | Category 2 hurricane | October 31 | 1899 |
| Unnamed | Category 1 hurricane | September 14 | 1904 |
| Unnamed | Category 1 hurricane | September 17 | 1906 |
| Unnamed | Category 2 hurricane | August 28 | 1911 |
| Unnamed | Category 1 hurricane | October 8 | 1913 |
| Unnamed | Category 2 hurricane | July 14 | 1916 |
| Unnamed | Category 1 hurricane | September 18 | 1928 |
| Unnamed | Category 2 hurricane | August 11 | 1940 |
| Unnamed | Category 2 hurricane | October 15 | 1947 |
| Able | Category 2 hurricane | August 31 | 1952 |
| Hazel | Category 4 hurricane | October 15 | 1954 |
| Cindy | Category 1 hurricane | July 9 | 1959 |
| Gracie | Category 4 hurricane | September 29 | 1959 |
| David | Category 2 hurricane | September 4 | 1979 |
| Bob | Category 1 hurricane | July 25 | 1985 |
| Hugo | Category 4 hurricane | September 22 | 1989 |
| Charley | Category 1 hurricane | August 14 | 2004 |
| Gaston | Category 1 hurricane | August 29 | 2004 |
| Matthew | Category 1 hurricane | October 8 | 2016 |
| Isaias | Category 1 hurricane | August 4 | 2020 |
| Ian | Category 1 hurricane | September 30 | 2022 |
Source: Chronological List of All Hurricanes which Affected the Continental United States

=== Texas ===
| Name | Saffir–Simpson Category | Date of closest approach | Year |
|---|---|---|---|
| Unnamed | Category 1 hurricane | June 25 | 1851 |
| Unnamed | Category 1 hurricane | June 26 | 1854 |
| Unnamed | Category 2 hurricane | September 18 | 1854 |
| Unnamed | Category 1 hurricane | September 13 | 1865 |
| Unnamed | Category 2 hurricane | July 15 | 1866 |
| Unnamed | Category 1 hurricane | October 2 | 1867 |
| Unnamed | Category 2 hurricane | August 17 | 1869 |
| Unnamed | Category 3 hurricane | September 16 | 1875 |
| Unnamed | Category 2 hurricane | August 23 | 1879 |
| Unnamed | Category 3 hurricane (Note: This hurricane made landfall in Mexico but produced hurricane conditions in Texas.) | August 13 | 1880 |
| Unnamed | Category 2 hurricane | June 14 | 1886 |
| Unnamed | Category 4 hurricane | August 20 | 1886 |
| Unnamed | Category 1 hurricane | September 23 | 1886 |
| Unnamed | Category 2 hurricane | October 12 | 1886 |
| Unnamed | Category 2 hurricane | September 21 | 1887 |
| Unnamed | Category 1 hurricane | June 17 | 1888 |
| Unnamed | Category 1 hurricane | July 5 | 1891 |
| Unnamed | Category 1 hurricane | August 30 | 1895 |
| Unnamed | Category 1 hurricane | September 13 | 1897 |
| Unnamed | Category 4 hurricane | September 9 | 1900 |
| Unnamed | Category 2 hurricane | June 29 | 1909 |
| Unnamed | Category 3 hurricane | July 21 | 1909 |
| Unnamed | Category 1 hurricane | August 27 | 1909 |
| Unnamed | Category 2 hurricane | September 14 | 1910 |
| Unnamed | Category 2 hurricane | October 16 | 1912 |
| Unnamed | Category 1 hurricane | June 27 | 1913 |
| Unnamed | Category 4 hurricane | August 17 | 1915 |
| Unnamed | Category 4 hurricane | August 18 | 1916 |
| Unnamed | Category 1 hurricane | August 7 | 1918 |
| Unnamed | Category 3 hurricane | September 14 | 1919 |
| Unnamed | Category 1 hurricane | June 22 | 1921 |
| Unnamed | Category 1 hurricane | June 28 | 1929 |
| Unnamed | Category 4 hurricane | August 14 | 1932 |
| Unnamed | Category 2 hurricane | August 7 | 1933 |
| Unnamed | Category 3 hurricane | September 5 | 1933 |
| Unnamed | Category 2 hurricane | July 25 | 1934 |
| Unnamed | Category 1 hurricane | June 27 | 1936 |
| Unnamed | Category 2 hurricane | August 8 | 1940 |
| Unnamed | Category 3 hurricane | September 23 | 1941 |
| Unnamed | Category 1 hurricane | August 21 | 1942 |
| Unnamed | Category 3 hurricane | August 30 | 1942 |
| Unnamed | Category 2 hurricane | July 27 | 1943 |
| Unnamed | Category 2 hurricane | August 27 | 1945 |
| Unnamed | Category 1 hurricane | August 24 | 1947 |
| Unnamed | Category 2 hurricane | October 4 | 1949 |
| Audrey | Category 2 hurricane | June 27 | 1957 |
| Debra | Category 1 hurricane | July 25 | 1959 |
| Carla | Category 4 hurricane | September 11 | 1961 |
| Beulah | Category 3 hurricane | September 20 | 1967 |
| Celia | Category 4 hurricane | August 3 | 1970 |
| Fern | Category 1 hurricane | September 10 | 1971 |
| Allen | Category 3 hurricane | August 10 | 1980 |
| Alicia | Category 3 hurricane | August 18 | 1983 |
| Bonnie | Category 1 hurricane | June 28 | 1986 |
| Chantal | Category 1 hurricane | August 1 | 1989 |
| Jerry | Category 1 hurricane | October 16 | 1989 |
| Bret | Category 3 hurricane | August 23 | 1999 |
| Claudette | Category 1 hurricane | July 15 | 2003 |
| Rita | Category 2 hurricane | September 24 | 2005 |
| Humberto | Category 1 hurricane | September 13 | 2007 |
| Dolly | Category 1 hurricane | July 23 | 2008 |
| Ike | Category 2 hurricane | September 13 | 2008 |
| Harvey | Category 4 hurricane | August 26 | 2017 |
| Hanna | Category 1 hurricane | July 25 | 2020 |
| Laura | Category 1 hurricane | August 27 | 2020 |
| Nicholas | Category 1 hurricane | September 14 | 2021 |
| Beryl | Category 1 hurricane | July 8 | 2024 |
Source: Chronological List of All Hurricanes which Affected the Continental United States

=== Virginia ===
| Name | Saffir–Simpson Category | Date of closest approach | Year |
|---|---|---|---|
| Unnamed | Category 1 hurricane | September 17 | 1876 |
| Unnamed | Category 1 hurricane | October 23 | 1878 |
| Unnamed | Category 2 hurricane | August 18 | 1879 |
| Unnamed | Category 1 hurricane | October 13 | 1893 |
| Unnamed | Category 1 hurricane | September 29 | 1894 |
| Unnamed | Category 1 hurricane | September 30 | 1896 |
| Unnamed | Category 1 hurricane | September 16 | 1933 |
| Unnamed | Category 1 hurricane | September 18 | 1936 |
| Unnamed | Category 2 hurricane | September 14 | 1944 |
| Connie | Category 1 hurricane | August 12 | 1955 |
| Donna | Category 1 hurricane | September 12 | 1960 |
| Isabel | Category 1 hurricane | September 19 | 2003 |
Source: Chronological List of All Hurricanes which Affected the Continental United States

== States bordering the Pacific Ocean ==
=== Southwestern United States ===
The 1858 San Diego hurricane is the only Pacific tropical cyclone known to have produced hurricane-force winds in California; it affected San Diego on October 2, 1858, though its center remained just offshore. In the 20th century, only four tropical cyclones produced tropical storm force winds in the southwestern United States: a tropical storm in September 1939 in California, Hurricane Joanne in October 1972 in Arizona, Hurricane Kathleen in September 1976 in Arizona and California, and Hurricane Nora in September 1997 in Arizona. In the 21st century, the only tropical cyclone to achieve this was Hurricane Hilary in 2023, which caused large amounts of flooding and power outages, along with heavy winds.

=== Hawaii ===
Hurricane Dora (2023) affected wildfires in Hawaii, "although there is some debate about how much influence the storm had as it passed about 500 miles south of the Hawaiian islands." However, it is not included in this list since this is a list of storms producing hurricane-force winds within the states and territories listed, not a list of hurricanes passing within 500 miles of Hawaii that made "history without making landfall."

Note: This section does not include tropical cyclones that affected the Northwestern Hawaiian Islands

| Name | Saffir–Simpson Category | Date of closest approach | Year |
|---|---|---|---|
| Hawaii and Maui | Category 3 hurricane | August 9 | 1871 |
| Dot | Category 1 hurricane | August 7 | 1959 |
| Iwa | Category 1 hurricane | November 24 | 1982 |
| Iniki | Category 4 hurricane | September 11 | 1992 |
| Lala | Category 1 hurricane | August 15 | 2026 |
| Lowell | Category 2 hurricane | September 8 | 2026 |

=== Alaska ===
No tropical cyclone has ever made landfall in Alaska while still tropical. However, the state is often impacted by the remnants of typhoons that underwent extratropical transitions. In 2022, Typhoon Merbok impacted Alaska as a hurricane-force extratropical cyclone. Three years later, Typhoon Halong brought also hurricane-force winds to the state along with storm surge and flooding that caused severe damage to many coastal towns.

== U.S. territories ==
=== American Samoa ===
Note: This section only includes tropical cyclones that occurred during or after 1900, when American Samoa was acquired by the United States

| Name | Saffir–Simpson Category | Date of closest approach | Year | Ref |
|---|---|---|---|---|
| "Honorine" (22P) | Category 1 tropical cyclone | February 25 | 1959 | |
| Tusi | Category 2 tropical cyclone | January 18 | 1987 | |
| Ofa | Category 1 tropical cyclone | February 3 | 1990 | |
| Val | Category 2 tropical cyclone | December 10 | 1991 | |
| Heta | Category 1 tropical cyclone | January 4 | 2004 | |
| Olaf | Category 3 tropical cyclone | February 16 | 2005 | |
| Rene | Category 1 tropical cyclone | February 13 | 2010 | |

=== Guam ===
Note: This section only includes tropical cyclones that occurred during or after 1899, when Guam was acquired by the United States

| Name | Saffir–Simpson Category | Date of closest approach | Year | Ref |
|---|---|---|---|---|
| Unnamed | Category 4 tropical cyclone | November 13 | 1900 | |
| Unnamed | Category 1 tropical cyclone | November 10 | 1913 | |
| Unnamed | Category 3 tropical cyclone | July 6 | 1918 | |
| Unnamed | Category 3 tropical cyclone | November 3 | 1940 | |
| Unnamed | Category 2 tropical cyclone | August 3 | 1941 | |
| Allyn | Category 2 tropical cyclone | November 17 | 1949 | |
| Lola | Category 2 tropical cyclone | November 15 | 1957 | |
| Karen | Category 5 tropical cyclone | November 11 | 1962 | |
| Olive | Category 1 tropical cyclone | April 29 | 1963 | |
| Sally | Category 1 tropical cyclone | September 5 | 1964 | |
| June | Category 1 tropical cyclone | November 19 | 1975 | |
| Pamela | Category 4 tropical cyclone | May 21 | 1976 | |
| Rita | Category 1 tropical cyclone | October 23 | 1978 | |
| Bill | Category 1 tropical cyclone | November 12 | 1984 | |
| Roy | Category 3 tropical cyclone | January 12 | 1988 | |
| Russ | Category 1 tropical cyclone | December 20 | 1990 | |
| Yuri | Category 2 tropical cyclone | November 27 | 1991 | |
| Omar | Category 3 tropical cyclone | August 28 | 1992 | |
| Brian | Category 1 tropical cyclone | October 21 | 1992 | |
| Gay | Category 2 tropical cyclone | November 23 | 1992 | |
| Paka | Category 4 tropical cyclone | December 16 | 1997 | |
| Chataan | Category 1 tropical cyclone | July 4 | 2002 | |
| Pongsona | Category 4 tropical cyclone | December 8 | 2002 | |
| Dolphin | Category 1 tropical cyclone | May 15 | 2015 | |
| Mawar | Category 4 tropical cyclone | May 24 | 2023 | |
Source: Historical Tropical Cyclones Affecting Guam and the Northern Mariana Islands (1671–1990)

=== Northern Mariana Islands ===
Note: This section only includes tropical cyclones that occurred during or after 1986, when the Northern Mariana Islands were acquired by the United States
This section only includes tropical cyclones that affected the main islands of Saipan, Tinian, and Rota

| Name | Saffir–Simpson Category | Date of closest approach | Year | Ref |
|---|---|---|---|---|
| Kim | Category 4 tropical cyclone | December 3 | 1986 | |
| Lynn | Category 1 tropical cyclone | October 18 | 1987 | |
| Roy | Category 3 tropical cyclone | January 12 | 1988 | |
| Mireille | Category 1 tropical cyclone | September 19 | 1991 | |
| Seth | Category 2 tropical cyclone | November 3 | 1991 | |
| Joan | Category 1 tropical cyclone | October 18 | 1997 | |
| Keith | Category 2 tropical cyclone | November 2 | 1997 | |
| Paka | Category 1 tropical cyclone | December 16 | 1997 | |
| Pongsona | Category 1 tropical cyclone | December 8 | 2002 | |
| Chaba | Category 3 tropical cyclone | August 22 | 2004 | |
| Vongfong | Category 2 tropical cyclone | October 5 | 2014 | |
| Dolphin | Category 1 tropical cyclone | May 15 | 2015 | |
| Soudelor | Category 4 tropical cyclone | August 2 | 2015 | |
| Mangkhut | Category 2 tropical cyclone | September 10 | 2018 | |
| Yutu | Category 5 tropical cyclone | October 24 | 2018 | |
| Sinlaku | Category 4 tropical cyclone | April 14 | 2026 | |
| Bavi | Category 5 tropical cyclone | July 6 | 2026 | |
Source: Historical Tropical Cyclones Affecting Guam and the Northern Mariana Islands (1671–1990)

=== Puerto Rico ===
This section only includes tropical cyclones that occurred during or after 1899, when Puerto Rico was acquired by the United States

| Name | Saffir–Simpson Category | Date of closest approach | Year | Ref |
|---|---|---|---|---|
| "San Ciriaco" | Category 4 hurricane | August 8 | 1899 | |
| "San Hipólito" | Category 2 hurricane | August 22 | 1916 | |
| "San Liborio" | Category 2 hurricane | July 24 | 1926 | |
| "San Felipe II" | Category 5 hurricane | September 13 | 1928 | |
| "San Nicolás" | Category 1 hurricane | September 11 | 1931 | |
| "San Ciprián" | Category 4 hurricane | September 27 | 1932 | |
| Betsy | Category 2 hurricane | August 12 | 1956 | |
| David | Category 1 hurricane | August 31 | 1979 | |
| Hugo | Category 3 hurricane | September 18 | 1989 | |
| Hortense | Category 1 hurricane | September 10 | 1996 | |
| Georges | Category 3 hurricane | September 21 | 1998 | |
| Irene | Category 1 hurricane | August 22 | 2011 | |
| Maria | Category 4 hurricane | September 20 | 2017 | |
| Fiona | Category 1 hurricane | September 18 | 2022 | |

=== United States Virgin Islands ===
Note: This section only includes tropical cyclones that occurred during or after 1917, when the United States Virgin Islands were acquired by the United States

| Name | Saffir–Simpson Category | Date of closest approach | Year | Ref |
|---|---|---|---|---|
| Unnamed | Category 2 hurricane | August 29 | 1924 | |
| "San Felipe II" | Category 4 hurricane | September 13 | 1928 | |
| "San Nicolás" | Category 1 hurricane | September 10 | 1931 | |
| "San Ciprian" | Category 2 hurricane | September 26 | 1932 | |
| Unnamed | Category 1 hurricane | July 26 | 1933 | |
| Hugo | Category 4 hurricane | September 18 | 1989 | |
| Marilyn | Category 2 hurricane | September 16 | 1995 | |
| Bertha | Category 1 hurricane | July 8 | 1996 | |
| Georges | Category 1 hurricane | September 21 | 1998 | |
| Lenny | Category 1 hurricane | November 17 | 1999 | |
| Omar | Category 1 hurricane | October 16 | 2008 | |
| Irma | Category 3 hurricane | September 6 | 2017 | |
| Maria | Category 3 hurricane | September 20 | 2017 | |
| Dorian | Category 1 hurricane | August 28 | 2019 | |

== Climatological statistics ==
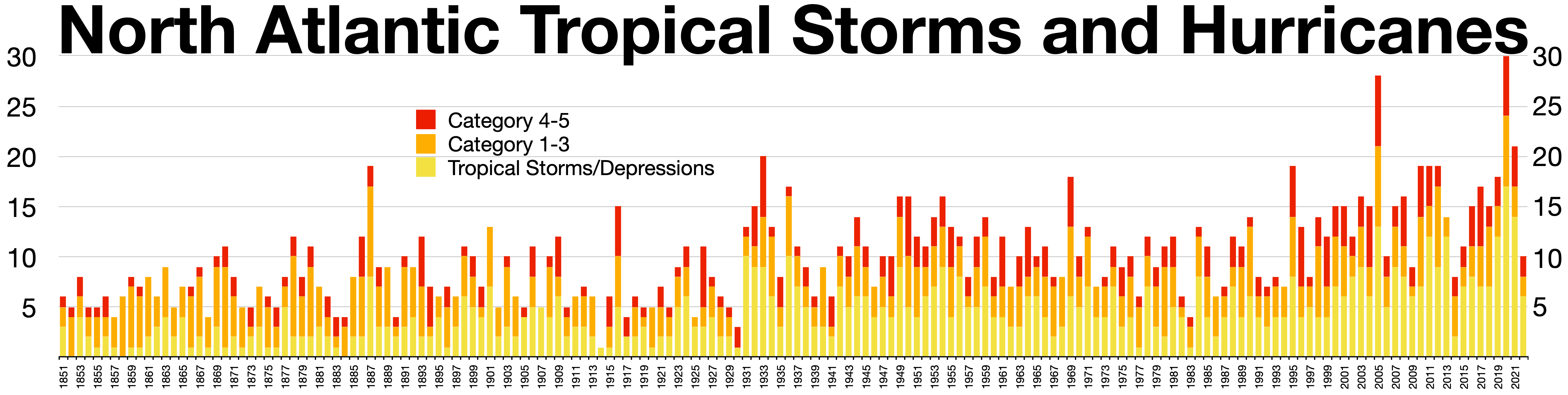
North Atlantic tropical storms and hurricanes Hurricane category 4-5 Hurricane category 1-3 Tropical storm or Tropical depression

The 20-year average of the number of annual Category 4 and 5 hurricanes in the Atlantic region has approximately doubled since the year 2000.

Category 5 hurricanes have become much more common in recent decades.

The number of $1 billion Atlantic hurricanes almost doubled from the 1980s to the 2010s, and inflation-adjusted costs have increased more than elevenfold. The increases have been attributed to climate change and to greater numbers of people moving to coastal areas.

Hurricanes reaching landfall in the U.S., by month.

Number of United States hurricane impacts / landfalls per decade since the 1850s
| Decade | Number of hurricanes |
|---|---|
| 1850s | 16 |
| 1860s | 15 |
| 1870s | 19 |
| 1880s | 25 |
| 1890s | 22 |
| 1900s | 17 |
| 1910s | 21 |
| 1920s | 15 |
| 1930s | 18 |
| 1940s | 23 |
| 1950s | 18 |
| 1960s | 13 |
| 1970s | 12 |
| 1980s | 16 |
| 1990s | 14 |
| 2000s | 19 |
| 2010s | 13 |
| 2020s | 15 |

== See also ==
- Climate of the United States
- List of Atlantic hurricanes
- List of Mexico hurricanes
- List of Canada hurricanes
- Historical Hurricane Tracks Viewer
