= Juliana González Valenzuela =

Mexican philosopher (born 1936)

Juliana Gonzalez Valenzuela
- Born: September 19, 1936

Juliana González Valenzuela (Mexico, September 19, 1936) is a Mexican philosopher.

== Academic biography ==
Juliana Gonzalez is a Mexican philosopher who has worked primarily in the areas of Greek Philosophy, Ontology, Ethics and Bioethics. She was born in Mexico City in 1936. She studied in the Faculty of Philosophy and Literature of the National Autonomous University (UNAM) where she received an ample humanistic education in philosophy, psychology, theater and history. The time she attended university was marked by an intellectual boom due mainly to the presence of the Spanish exiles that arrived in Mexico from 1939 until the end of the Spanish Civil War. They were determinant in her studies, especially the Catalan philosopher Eduardo Nicol. She became his pupil as well as a member of his Seminar on Metaphysics for over 20 years and at the same time she worked in the field of Ethics on her own philosophical inquiries.

She began her career as a professor in the Faculty of Philosophy and Literature of UNAM in 1968. She taught Greek Philosophy, Metaphysics and Ethics. She has also been a Professor in the Postgraduate Research Seminars on Metaphysics, Ethics and Bioethics. As part of her formative work she has directed 45 theses (23 in BA, 22 postgraduate). Some of her students are now researchers or professors in different Universities and education centers. She was named Professor Emeritus of the National University in 2000 and also received the distinction of Researcher Emeritus of the National System of Researchers of Mexico. She was awarded the National Award of Arts and Sciences in Philosophy in 2004, the National University Award in Research in Humanities and the Doctorate Honoris Causa of UNAM.

Parallel to her academic work, Juliana Gonzalez has held several offices at UNAM. She was the director of the Faculty of Philosophy and Literature from 1990 to 1998 and a member of the Governing Board from 1998 to 2006. She is currently the director of the Research Seminar of Ethics and Bioethics of the same university.

In April, 2021 Juliana González received the Premio Internacional Eulalio Ferrer 2020-2021 in recognition of her contributions to the humanities. She is the first woman to be awarded the prize (previous recipients include Manuel Castells, Fernando Savater, Tzvetan Todorov and Roger Bartra.)

== Philosophical ideas and written works ==
Juliana González has published twenty-one books, seven as an author and fourteen as an editor. She has also written seventy-four chapters in books and sixty articles in magazines.

As the pupil of Eduardo Nicol, Juliana Gonzalez has dedicated numerous writings to the study of the metaphysical and humanistic works of this author. She wrote a book titled The Dialectic Metaphysics of Eduardo Nicol (1981) and edited three more: Tribute to Eduardo Nicol (1990), Eduardo Nicol. Philosophy as Symbolic Reason (1998) and Eduardo Nicol (1998) as well as writing 16 book chapters and several articles on this subject. In the work of Juliana Gonzalez, Nicol's philosophy has been a constant reference.

Her philosophical works has been centered mainly in the search for a new foundation of Ethics that can give an answer to the new knowledge and needs of our time. This research has led Juliana Gonzalez into some of the philosophical and scientific lines of thinking that have placed our conceptions of reality, life and human nature in crisis. Gonzalez has adopted the view that any historical advancement requires a return to the origins of Philosophy. From her perspective, we need a permanent dialogue with the Greek philosophers, unavoidable sources to use in order to renovate humanism and Ethics. This is especially true of Heraclitus, Socrates and Plato, authors Juliana Gonzalez has worked with in several of her books, mainly Ethics and Freedom (1989) and The Ethos, Destiny of Man (1996) and The Power of Eros: Foundations and Values in Ethics and Bioethics (2000).

From her earliest work, Juliana Gonzalez has delved in the study of the ontological issues of the being of man, freedom, time and human communication that were raised by the existentialist philosophers, especially Heidegger and Sartre, as well as the literature of the time. These studies form the basis of her Master's dissertation on Philosophy and several essays included in some of her books, markedly Ethics and Freedom. And even though she maintains a critical perspective faced with these authors, she is certain that this is the starting point for any and all future Ethics and Ontology.

Juliana Gonzalez has worked on finding the philosophical foundation of the ethical condition of man and freedom in human nature itself, from an immanent conception of man and critiquing the dualist conceptions that –from her philosophical view- are unsustainable. Also, she believes that free will is necessary for Ethics and it is in this line that she worked on a study from the Greek Philosophers to thinkers like Spinoza and writers such as Dostoyevsky and Kafka, whom she considers crucial to Ethics. This work became the book Ethics and Freedom. Her research on the foundations of ethics and values were collected in the book The Ethos, Destiny of Man and The Power of Eros.

The Ethos, Destiny of Man is a book that explores and proposes a humanistic foundation of Ethics while acknowledging an Ontology of man capable of explaining the ethical condition as well the axiological one. One of the virtues of this book is that it gets over the clash between the realms of being and value.

In the Power of Eros, the author proposes an integral view of the moral facts. In this book, Juliana Gonzalez works on the subject of Eros as a vital origin of Ethics and as a way to understand human nature with categories that explain the ambiguity, the temporal condition and the constitutive ethical framework of human beings. In the second part of the book she deals with issues of bioethics, the present and future of the human condition. The main points she holds here are that Bioethics is a philosophical and lay issue, its ontological foundation, centered on human nature, the universal character of humanistic criteria, the relativity of moral decisions as well as the need for a multidisciplinary comprehension of bioethical issues.

In another cultural context, far from the platonic one, Juliana Gonzalez finds the mythical symbol of Eros in the work of Freud. And it is here, in the study of the Cultural Revolution that Freudian psychoanalysis brought to our attention, that the author finds another relevant subject to understand the crisis of ethical thinking. In her book Freud and the Crisis of Ethics (1986), she proposes a philosophical understanding of Freud's work, highlighting on the one hand the aspects that contribute to questioning the meaning of culture and morality and on the other, the meaningful moment when Freud identifies Eros with the life impulses that are opposed to the death impulses of Thanatos. The erotic impulses are then, for the author, interpreted as the foundation for the ethical condition of man.

For Juliana Gonzalez, it is impossible to ignore Nietzsche in the analysis of ethical issues, since his work has been determinant to both the crisis of Ethics and the new horizons that it opens for us, as she discusses in her book The Hero in the Soul: Three Essays on Nietszche (1994).

Other issues Juliana Gonzalez has worked on are the problems of medical ethics in particular and bioethics in general. She has worked on these problems from a philosophical perspective that converges with the advances in life sciences. This view includes matters of praxis, theory and knowledge, all derived from the advancement of genomics and neurosciences especially. She has shown that some of these advancements can create a crisis for our conception of humankind that is focused on freedom and morality. In this sense, what is most important for philosophy is not the principles and norms of bioethics that guide the scientific and technological work, but the impact the new knowledge has on our traditional conceptions of life and the human reality as well as other life forms, and our individual and social life.

From her work on the ethical issues stemming from genetics, Juliana Gonzalez wrote Human Genome and Human Dignity) (2005). This book expresses her philosophical awe of the facts revealed by molecular genetics (in particular the unity of life through DNA) and she presents a critical analysis of the ontological issues of dignity and human freedom in face of determinism and genetic manipulation, both of individuals and communities.

Juliana Gonzalez founded the Research Seminar on Ethics and Bioethics in 1998, which was transformed into the Seminar on Ethics and Bioethics in 2002 and finally into the current Research Seminar on Ethics and Bioethics in 2009. This Seminar works on multidisciplinary research and has produced several books with the participation of biologists, geneticists, historians, neuroscientists, psychologists, philosophers, medical doctors, lawyers, ecologists, economists, etc. The Seminar has published the following books: Bioethical Dilemmas, Bioethical Perspectives, Philosophy and Life Sciences and is working on another one, to be published soon: Rethinking Life and Value.

== Books ==
- The Metaphysics of Eduardo Nicol (1981)
- Morality and its Discontents. Freud and the Crisis of Ethics (1986)
- Ethics and Freedom (1989)
- The Hero in the Soul (1996)
- Ethos, Destiny of Man (1996)
- The Power of Eros (2001)
- Human Genome and Human Dignity (2005)

== Awards and distinctions ==
- Doctor Honoris Causa, UNAM
- Emeritus Professor of the Faculty of Philosophy and Literature of UNAM
- Emeritus Researcher of the National System of Researchers
- National Award of Sciences and Arts in Philosophy
- National University Award for Research in Humanities
- Premio Internacional Eulalio Ferrer 2020-2021
