= Enrique Canales =

Enrique Canales (1936–2007), born in Monterrey, Nuevo Leon, Mexico, was a technologist, editor, political analyst, painter, and sculptor.

== Education and professional life ==
Canales graduated as a mechanical engineer manager in the Technological Institute of Superior Studies of Monterrey and obtained a PhD specializing in technology in the University of Houston. Canales presents himself as a technologist, writer and painter His pictorial and plastic work was exhibited in numerous museums and galleries such as the Museum of Glass in Monterrey, Monterrey Museum, Gallery of Mexican Art, Tamayo Museum of Contemporary Art, Chapultepec Museum, Museum José Luis Cuevas, all three of them located in Mexico City, Gallery quetzalli in Oaxaca, the Amparo Museum in Puebla (which has an extensive collection of Canales) and Museum of Contemporary Art in Monterrey, among others, he also exhibited his work in Bogota and Paris and developed a plastic work out of glass and clay. He had long stays in Brasil and the United States; in his journeys he found the diversity which has been projected in his work. He started working as an artist when he was 45 years old and without previous studies he started developing experimental methods in order to become self-educated. Five of his most beautiful stained glass windows are found in the Escuela Superior de Música y Danza de Monterrey. He is considered the artista of both, colors and rebellion.

Canales Santos was also director and counselor in the most important companies from Monterrey, specially in the technology's development.

In addition to his work as an editorial column writer in the newspapers of 'Grupo Reforma' ', he collaborated with the newspaper' 'El Porvenir' 'Monterrey, Mexico. As a writer he developed themes of social criticism, science and technology. Had a capsule in TV Azteca Noreste.

== Awards and distinctions ==
On May 29, 2007, the Mexican artist received the 2007 Crystal Award from the Museo de Vidrio in the framework of the celebration of the fifteenth anniversary as a cultural space in Monterrey, Mexico, for his work developed in glass. He was awarded the 'Medal of Civic Merit' "Presea Estado de Nuevo León" in the field of art in May 2007.
