= Soli I =

Quartet composed by Carlos Chávez

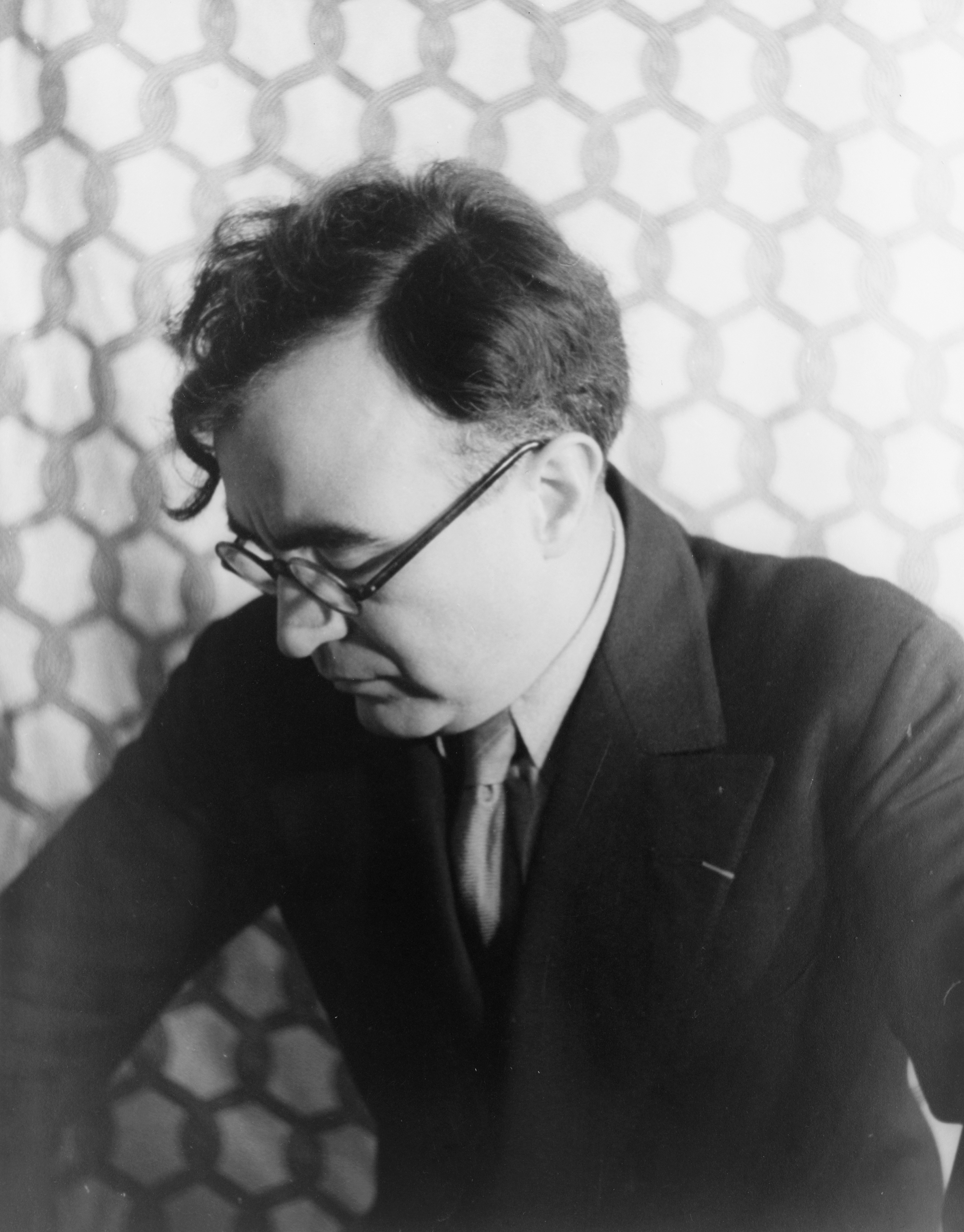
Carlos Chávez in 1937

Soli I is the first of a series of four works by the Mexican composer Carlos Chávez, each called Soli and each featuring a succession of instrumental solos. Three of these compositions are chamber music, and the remaining one is a sort of concerto grosso for four soloists and orchestra. This first work of the series is a quartet for oboe, clarinet, bassoon, and trumpet.

The Solis belong to the more "experimental", high-modernist strand of Chávez's compositional output, in contrast to the more traditional character of most of the large-ensemble works. This group of works, which also includes the three Inventions (No. 1 for piano, 1958; No. 2 for string trio, 1965; No. 3 for harp, 1967) and the orchestral compositions Resonancias (1964), Elatio (1967), Discovery, Clio (both 1969), and Initium (1973), features an abstract, atonal musical language based on the principle of non-repetition. Soli I was Chávez's first attempt at this idea of constant renewal, which avoids traditional techniques of sequence, imitation, development, and structural symmetry in favour of an endlessly unfolding counterpoint. In the composer's own words, the objective is one of "constant rebirth, of true derivation: a stream that never comes back to its source; a stream of eternal development, like a spiral, always linked to, and continuing, its original source, but always searching for new and unlimited spaces".

== History ==
Soli I was composed in March 1933 on a commission from the League of Composers, in celebration of their tenth anniversary. Chávez gave it the title Soli because in each of its four movements one of the instruments assumes a concertante role, playing a main part or "solo", but without relegating its companions to a secondary level of simple accompaniment.

== Analysis ==
Soli I is scored for oboe, clarinet, trumpet, and bassoon. It is in four movements, each of which foregrounds one of the four instruments in the ensemble, and features a distinctive metric character:

1. Sciolto e ritmato (changing meters, clarinet)
2. Moderato (3/4, bassoon)
3. Molto lento (5/4, oboe)
4. Vivo (6/8, trumpet)

The clarinet is the featured instrument in the first movement, which is jazzy with polyrhythmic inflections. It is in binary form with a transition in the middle.

The second movement is in a moderate tempo with the bassoon as soloist. It differs from the first movement in that it maintains a constant 3/4 meter but, like its predecessor, can be analyzed as a binary structure.

The oboe takes the foreground in the third movement, which is in a slow 5/4 time ( = 48). The movement is cast in a five parts, set off from one another by the alternating tempo markings molto lento and pochiss. piu mosso but, unlike the first two movements, the motivic writing here avoids repetition in favor of unfolding constantly new ideas.

In the finale, the trumpet unrolls its melody in a constant process of renewal, and with a "very filtered 'Mexican' tint". Hemiola, cross-rhythms, and sharp articulations occur within its 6/8 meter, and numerous mute changes in the trumpet produce a constant timbral variety. All of the instruments exploit nearly their entire range, as the rhythms evoke the Huapango and Jarabe dance forms..

== Discography ==
- Chávez Conducted by Carlos Chávez: Soli I, Soli II, Soli IV. Ruben Islas, flute; Sally Van Den Berg, oboe; Anastasio Flores, clarinet; Louis Salomons, bassoon; Felipe Leon, trumpet; Vicente Zarzo, horn; Clemente Sanabria, trombone; Carlos Chávez, cond. LP recording, 1 disc: 12 in., 33⅓rpm, stereo. Odyssey Y 31534. New York: Columbia Records, 1972.
- The Westwood Wind Quintet Plays Music by Cortés, Chávez, Revueltas and Ginastera. Carlos Chávez: Soli I. Thomas Stevens, trumpet; members of the Westwood Wind Quintet. LP recording, 1 disc: 33⅓ rpm, stereo 12 in. Crystal S 812. Los Angeles: Crystal Records, 1973.
- México del siglo XX. Vol. 2. Soli I and works by Nancarrow, Gutiérrez, Lavista, Ibarra, and Lara. Jorge Rivero, oboe; Luis Humberto Ramos, clarinet; David Ball, bassoon; Neal Woolworth, trumpet. Recorded in the Sala Blas Galindo, C.N.A. CD recording, 1 disc: digital, 12 cm, stereo. Quindecim QP033. México, DF: Quindecim Recordings, 1999.
- Carlos Chávez: Complete Chamber Music Vol. 2. Energía, Soli I, Soli II, Soli IV, Sonata for Four Horns. Southwest Chamber Music. CD recording, 1 disc: digital, 12 cm, stereo. Cambria CD8851. Lomita, CA: Cambria Master Recordings, 2004.
