= Saturnino Osornio =

Mexican politician

Saturnino Osornio Ramírez
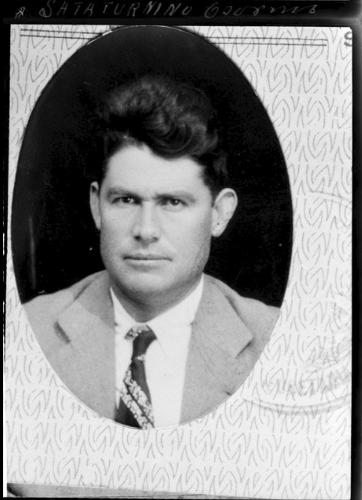
- Born: Saturnino Osornio Ramírez; November 29, 1896; San Juan del Río, Querétaro, Mexico
- Died: December 28, 1976 (aged 80); San Juan del Río, Querétaro, Mexico
- Title: Governor of Queretaro

Saturnino Osornio Ramírez (November 29, 1896 - December 28, 1976) was the governor of Querétaro from 1931 to 1934. He was a native of Queretaro, born in San Juan del Rio. As governor, Osornio was accused of being the intellectual author of a murder, but he refused to recognize the authority of the federal prosecutor.

== Governor ==
Saturnino Osornio served as governor of Queretaro from 1931 to 1935, when the country went into a tailspin, feeling the effects of the Great Depression. Landed Queretaranos could not accept a peasant as governor and opposed his government. They immediately rejected the government programs in relation to their educational and agricultural project. Saturnino Osornio strengthened farmer organizations that had been developing since 1925 and joined the Federation of Associations of Agricultural and rural state. Osornio pushed for the distribution of land. On the other hand they closed the wealthy Civil Association called because of its high cost and that was dedicated only to the powerful. He closed the temples and promoted socialist education. He began public school and health service by the government, an issue that antagonized the wealthy classes of the state.

== Death ==
Respectful of the governments that followed and reluctant to testify "of overdue accounts," he spent his last years in a house of Tacuba in Mexico City, where he died without receiving a tribute to his former endowment. Saturnino Osornio is known for generations that followed as the most controversial ruling that Queretaro has had throughout its history. It is also said more than Saturnino Osornio died in 1963. He also said he died at his home in Querétaro.

Preceded by Antonio Pérez Alcocer	Governor of Querétaro (1931-1934)	Succeeded by Ramón Rodríguez Familiar
