= Gonzalo Vázquez Vela =

Mexican politician

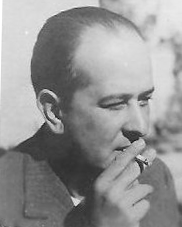
Gonzalo Vázquez Vela

Gonzalo Vázquez Vela (July 3, 1893 - November 7, 1963) was a Mexican politician. He was governor of Veracruz and became leader of the Secretariat of Public Education (SEP) in 1935.
