= 1933 Florida–Mexico hurricane =

Category 1 Atlantic hurricane in 1933

Hurricane Five 1933 Florida–Mexico hurricane
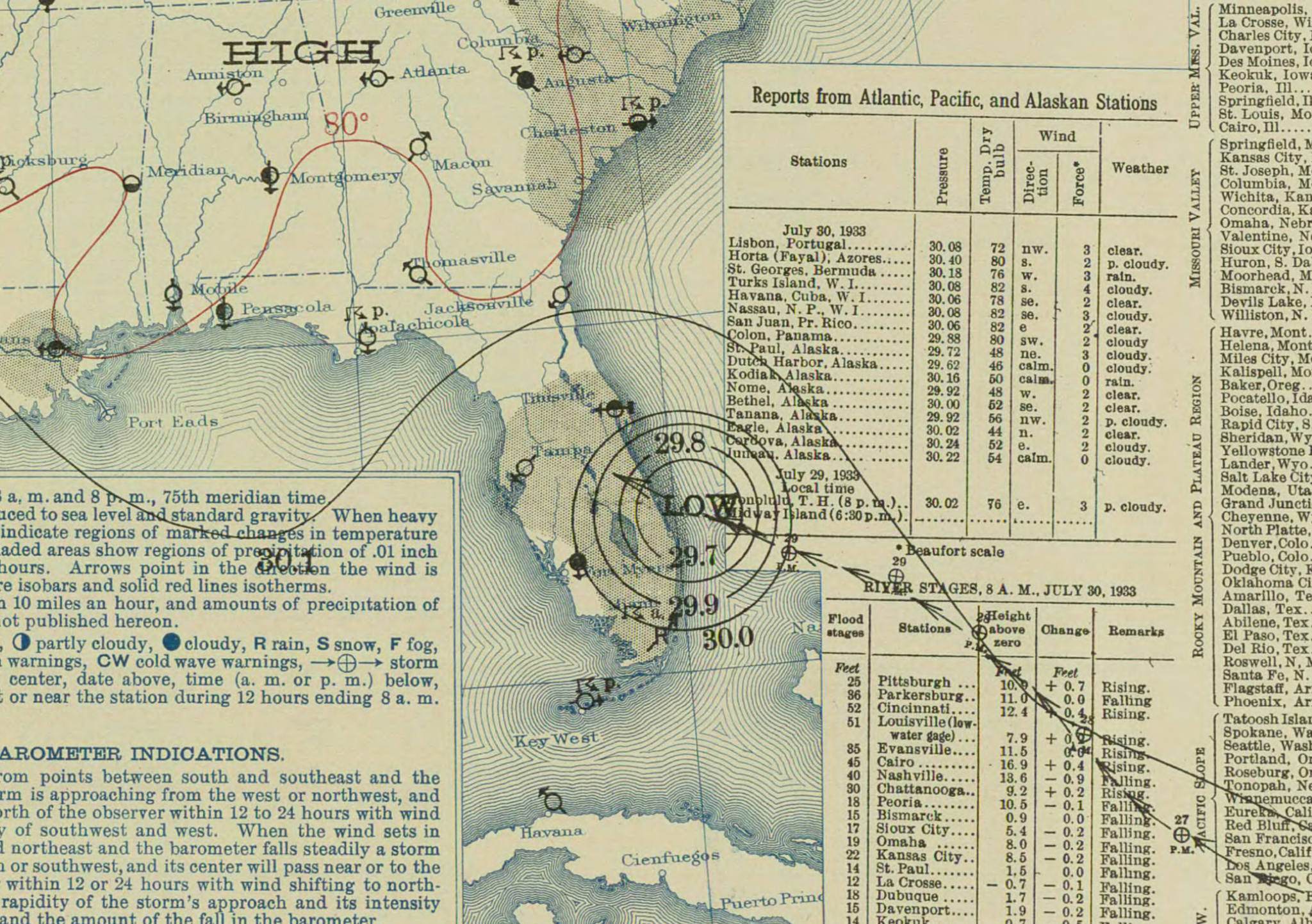
- Surface weather analysis of the hurricane nearing landfall in Central Florida on July 30

Meteorological history
- Formed: July 24, 1933
- Dissipated: August 5, 1933

Category 1 hurricane
- 1-minute sustained (SSHWS/NWS)
- Highest winds: 90 mph (150 km/h)
- Lowest pressure: 975 mbar (hPa); 28.79 inHg

Overall effects
- Fatalities: 39 total
- Damage: $3 million (1933 USD) ($72.9 million in 2024 USD)
- Areas affected: Leeward Islands; Turks and Caicos Islands; British Bahamas; Florida; Mexico; Texas
- IBTrACS
- Part of the 1933 Atlantic hurricane season

The 1933 Florida–Mexico hurricane was the first of five Atlantic hurricanes to affect the United States during the very active 1933 Atlantic hurricane season. (Note: Only three of these directly hit the U.S. coastline; the fifth curved out to sea but brought hurricane winds ashore.) The fifth tropical cyclone of the year, it formed east of the Lesser Antilles on July 24, rapidly strengthening as it moved west-northwest. It passed over or near Antigua, Saba, and Saint Thomas, reaching hurricane status on July 26. In the northeastern Caribbean it produced heavy rains and killed at least six people. Over the next three days, it moved north of the Caribbean, paralleling the Lucayan Archipelago. As it crossed the Bahamas, the storm drowned at least one person and caused extensive damage. On July 29, a strong ridge nudged it westward, presaging landfall near Hobe Sound, Florida, a day later. One of two hurricanes to hit the Treasure Coast in 1933, the compact storm unraveled inland, reaching the eastern Gulf of Mexico near Charlotte Harbor as a tropical storm. A minimal hurricane, it caused little wind damage in Florida, but generated heavy rains and localized floods.

Once over water, the storm shifted its course to the west-southwest and gradually regained intensity, its path bringing it to the mouth of the Rio Grande in early August. On August 4 the storm restrengthened into a hurricane, just a day before striking near Playa Lauro Villar—a site in northern Tamaulipas, Mexico—with winds of 90 mph (150 km/h), equal to a high-end Category 1 hurricane on the Saffir–Simpson scale; it was the first of two hurricanes in 1933 to impact nearby South Texas. Hitting close to the Mexico–United States border, its winds damaged buildings and crops in both nations, with heavy losses to citrus production in the Rio Grande Valley. While only one person died in the United States, the storm dropped much rain over northern Mexico, engendering catastrophic floods that claimed at least 31 lives, with the worst-hit areas being in and near the city of Monterrey. While monetary losses in Mexico were unclear, the storm did at least $3,000,000 in damages in the United States, measured in contemporary U.S. dollars. (Note: All currency totals are unadjusted for inflation.)

== Meteorological history ==
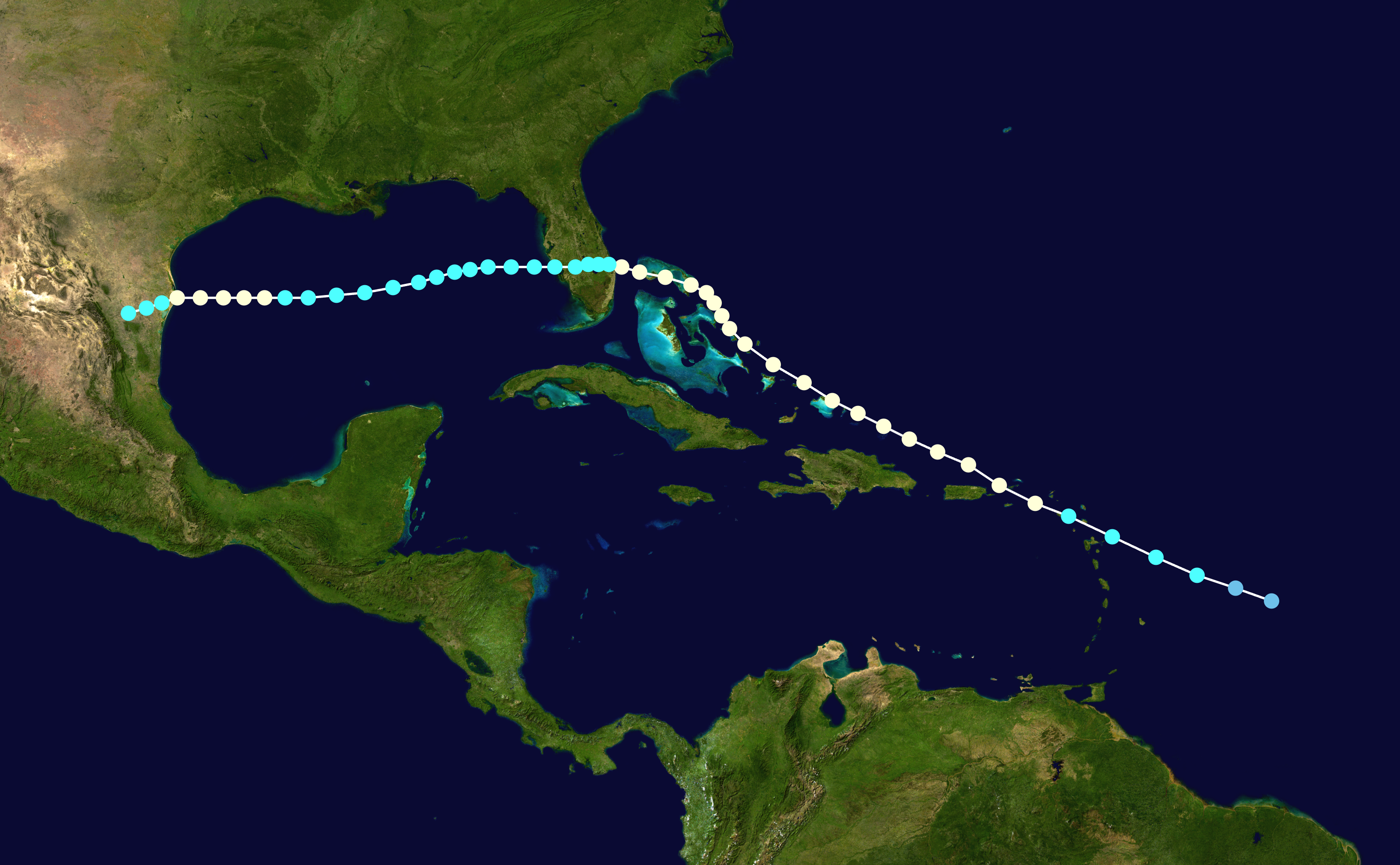
Map plotting the storm's track and intensity, according to the Saffir–Simpson scale Map key Saffir–Simpson scale Tropical depression (≤38 mph, ≤62 km/h) Tropical storm (39–73 mph, 63–118 km/h) Category 1 (74–95 mph, 119–153 km/h) Category 2 (96–110 mph, 154–177 km/h) Category 3 (111–129 mph, 178–208 km/h) Category 4 (130–156 mph, 209–251 km/h) Category 5 (≥157 mph, ≥252 km/h) Unknown Storm type Tropical cyclone Subtropical cyclone Extratropical cyclone, remnant low, tropical disturbance, or monsoon depression

The origins of the storm were from a tropical depression that was located on July 24 about 430 mi (690 km) east of Saint Lucia in the Windward Islands. This was based on analysis of ship reports and evidence of a closed low-pressure area, as conducted by the Hurricane Research Division in 2012. The depression formed at the same time as another tropical system developed over 450 mi (725 km) east of Bermuda. Upon formation, it moved generally west-northwest, toward the eastern Caribbean, becoming a tropical storm on July 25. At 16:00 UTC the vessel Daytonian first recorded gale-force winds—45 mph (72 km/h), or Beaufort Force 9. Around that time, the storm made landfall on the island of Antigua with winds of 60–70 mph (95–110 km/h). A barometer on Saba measured 983 mb (29.02 inHg), implying maximum sustained winds of 85 mph (140 km/h); based on this, the storm is estimated to have acquired hurricane status on July 26. The storm traversed the United States Virgin Islands, missing Puerto Rico to its northeast, and on July 27 passed a short distance to the north of Grand Turk Island, gradually bending northwest as it followed the arc of the eastern Bahamas. On July 28 the cyclone struck Cat Island with winds of 80 mph (130 km/h), and the next day made another landfall on the Abaco Islands with the same winds. A robust subtropical ridge then caused it to veer westward, toward the east coast of Florida. On July 30, the ship El Almirante became the only vessel to detect hurricane winds in the storm.

The storm made its only landfall in the United States on Jupiter Island, Florida, between Port Salerno and Hobe Sound, around 16:00 UTC. A ship nearby measured 992 mb (29.3 inHg) and winds of 50 mph (80 km/h), consistent with a landfall value of 988 mb (29.2 inHg); from this reanalysis derived winds of 75 mph (120 km/h), due to a tight pressure gradient and small storm size. After landfall, the storm weakened to a tropical storm and moved slowly westward across the south-central peninsula, crossing the northern end of Lake Okeechobee early on July 31. It then passed slightly north of Punta Gorda, exiting the state between Venice and Englewood with winds of 45 mph (75 km/h). Once in the Gulf of Mexico, it encountered few ships, complicating efforts to discern its location and intensity. On August 1, it began a persistent west-southwest motion that continued for the rest of its lifecycle. A few ships on August 1–3 noted modest gales of 40 mph (64 km/h) and minimum pressures of 1,004 mb (29.65 inHg), confirming a weaker cyclone than earlier. Based on the latter, reanalysis inferred that the storm began gradually restrengthening on August 2, reaching 65 mph (100 km/h) at the time of the reading. On August 4 the storm reclaimed hurricane status, unbeknown to forecasters at the time, who lacked ample marine observations. Angling westward, it reached a secondary peak of 90 mph (150 km/h), and around 01:00 UTC on August 5, its eye made landfall near Playa Lauro Villar, Tamaulipas, just south of the Rio Grande, as verified by anemometers in Brownsville, Texas. Based on these, scientists determined the radius of maximum wind to be 30 mi (50 km). Brownsville also documented pressures of 981 to 982 mb (28.98 to 29 inHg), attesting a central value of 975 mb (28.79 inHg). Now hooking west-southwest, the storm quickly weakened due to high terrain and vanished over easternmost Nuevo León by 18:00 UTC.

== Preparations ==
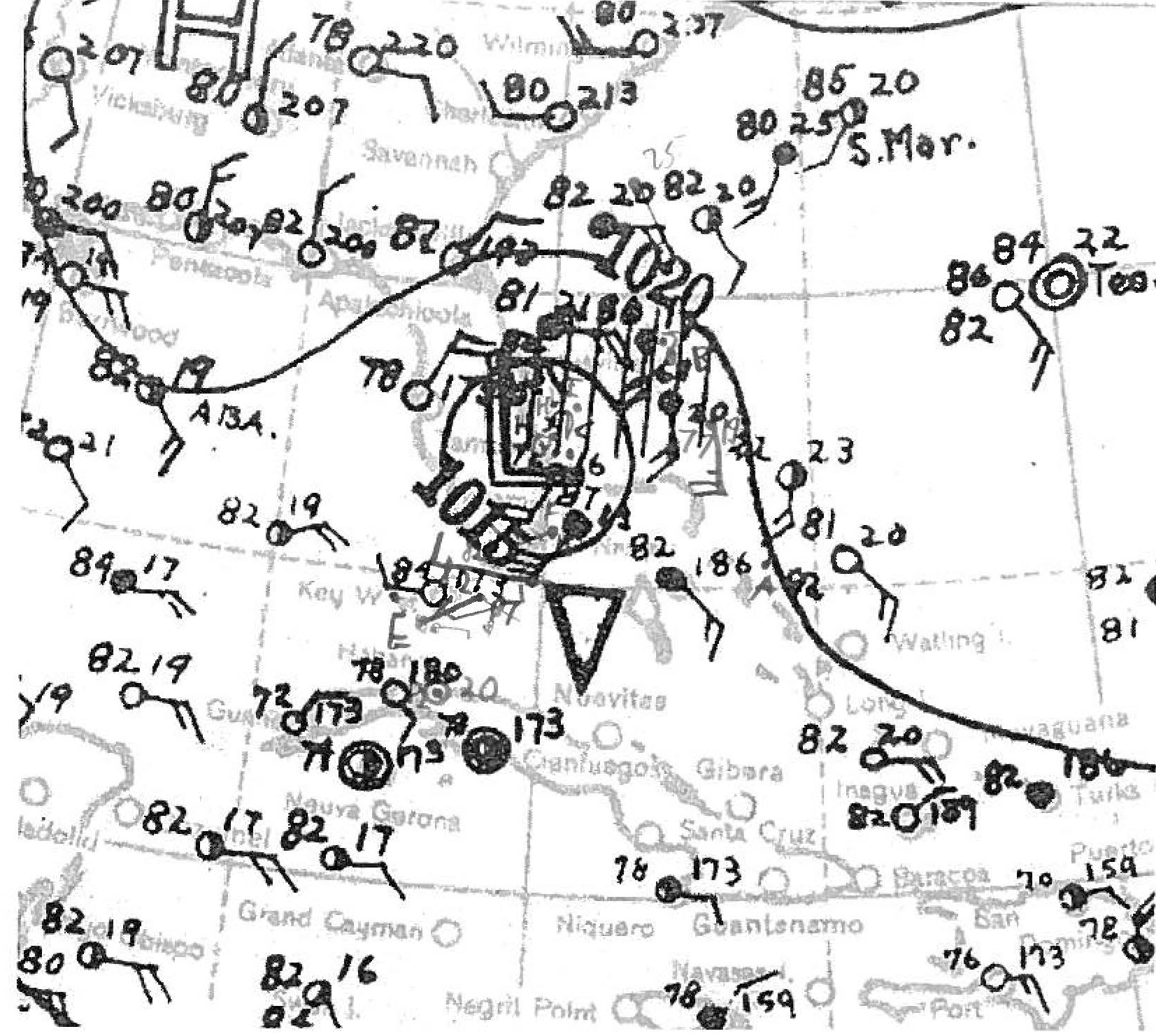
Weather map of the storm over Central Florida

On Saint Croix officials fortified public property, and the Boy Scouts of America advised people to leave insecure buildings. Residents across Puerto Rico boarded up windows and bolted roofs in anticipation of damaging winds. Governor Robert Hayes Gore placed the Hurricane Relief Organization and Red Cross on standby. As the storm neared Florida, the United States Weather Bureau—now the National Weather Service—posted storm warnings between Miami and Titusville. Officials later extended these to the west coast from Punta Rassa to Tarpon Springs. Floridians secured watercraft and covered windows, while others left beachfronts for safety. Other denizens took few precautions, expecting the storm to remain weak. The Weather Bureau radioed the position and movement of the storm, allowing citizens to receive timely warnings. Palm Beach County prison guards relocated 36 convicts to a Fort Lauderdale jail, where wardens also accepted 30 pet raccoons and many dogs. Due to high water levels, Florida governor David Sholtz empowered local authorities to evacuate over 5,000 residents, most of whom were black farmworkers, from low-lying areas around Lake Okeechobee. Evacuations took place in the communities of Belle Glade, Pahokee, Canal Point, Okeechobee, and Clewiston. Most of the evacuees left by train, anticipating washouts on the trackbeds. Several railway companies waived passenger fees and readied trains at strategic points. Relief groups and local mayors distributed milk, biscuits, and coffee to refugees. Forecasters also urged beachgoers to avoid high tides, issuing storm warnings for part of the Texas coast, including the cities of Brownsville and Freeport. The Weather Bureau notified people early enough to allow mass evacuations; most dwellers and campers vacated the barrier islands, while the majority of Port Isabel's 500 residents fled, of whom a remnant sheltered in a sturdy brick store on the highest land available.

== Impact ==
Throughout its path from the Caribbean, to Florida, and finally into Texas and Mexico, the hurricane claimed 39 lives. 31 deaths occurred in Mexico, six in Saint Kitts, and one each in the Bahamas and Texas. Total losses from the storm in the United States reached about $3 million, inclusive of Florida and Texas, though figures for the latter state varied from $500,000 to $2 million, according to various sources. Prolific rains accounted for most of these losses. In September a much stronger cyclone buffeted the same area of Florida as the July storm, with winds of 125 mph (205 km/h) doing extensive damage that overshadowed the earlier cyclone.

=== Caribbean and Lucayan Archipelago ===
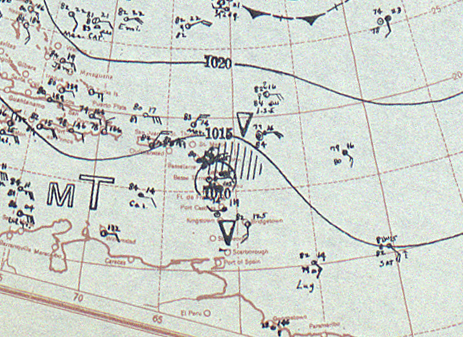
Surface weather analysis of the cyclone over the Lesser Antilles on July 25

As it passed over the Lesser Antilles, the storm caused at least six deaths on the island of Saint Kitts—then known as Saint Christopher Island—and the Virgin Islands reported hurricane velocities, but without damage. The barometer dipped to 1,005 mb (29.69 inHg) as the storm bypassed the islands to the south. Antigua also experienced gales and a pressure of 1,002 mb (29.59 inHg). At Christiansted, Saint Croix, surf swept well inland, capsizing a boat and tossing another off its davits. Crops and farm fencing on the island sustained some damage as well, though overall effects were limited. Coincidentally, the storm arrived the day after Hurricane Supplication Day, a local tradition marking the opening of hurricane season on the fourth Monday in July. As the storm bypassed Saint Thomas, the island clocked northeast winds of 60 mph (97 km/h), but no damage occurred aside from some washouts. Rough seas attended the storm as well. At San Juan, Puerto Rico, the storm only spawned heavy showers.

In the Lucayan Archipelago hurricane-force winds and turbulent seas resulted in locally severe damage. Winds visually estimated at 85 mph (137 km/h) battered Grand Turk Island, badly damaging the salt industry. In the Bahamas, winds peaked at 84 mph (135 km/h) on the Abaco Islands, but caused only minimal damage there. Other reports indicated more severe damage elsewhere in the islands, including across the Turks and Caicos Islands, and one death from drowning. The hurricane's waves dragged out to sea the American schooner Adams, anchored off Grand Turk.

=== Florida ===
As the storm struck Florida, its narrow wind field affected 60 mi (95 km) of coast, with the worst effects concentrated between Stuart and Fort Pierce. These and neighboring communities felt peak velocities of 60 to 70 mph (97 to 113 km/h). (Note: Based on these, Florida officials at first judged the storm to be of less than hurricane force.) Hobe Sound intercepted the eye passage, during which "hardly a needle in pine trees" stirred. A minimum pressure of 1,004 mb (29.66 inHg) occurred in Stuart and Jupiter—unusually high for a hurricane, a quirk meteorologists ascribed to the trajectory and speed of the storm. On Lake Okeechobee winds topped out at 40 to 50 mph (64 to 80 km/h), progressively diminishing inland and near the west coast. Weather Bureau offices in Tampa and other Gulf cities observed winds of no more than 39 mph (63 km/h). Areas well to the south and north of the landfall site, such as Broward County, saw virtually no impact. Heavy rains followed the path of the storm, peaking at 15.7 in (400 mm) in West Palm Beach. A rain gauge at the Palm Beach Post office counted 12.01 in (305 mm) on July 30–31, setting a 24-hour record at that location—3.19 in (81 mm) higher than the week of the 1928 Okeechobee hurricane. This established a monthly record as well, the total being 23.28 in (591 mm) for July, and over 15.25 in (387 mm) fell in a few days. Other sites reporting downpours included Indiantown, which collected 12.02 in (305 mm), and a water transport lock, which received 15.6 in (400 mm). Rain gauges elsewhere overflowed or blew away, making undercounts likely; storm total estimates reached 20 in (510 mm).

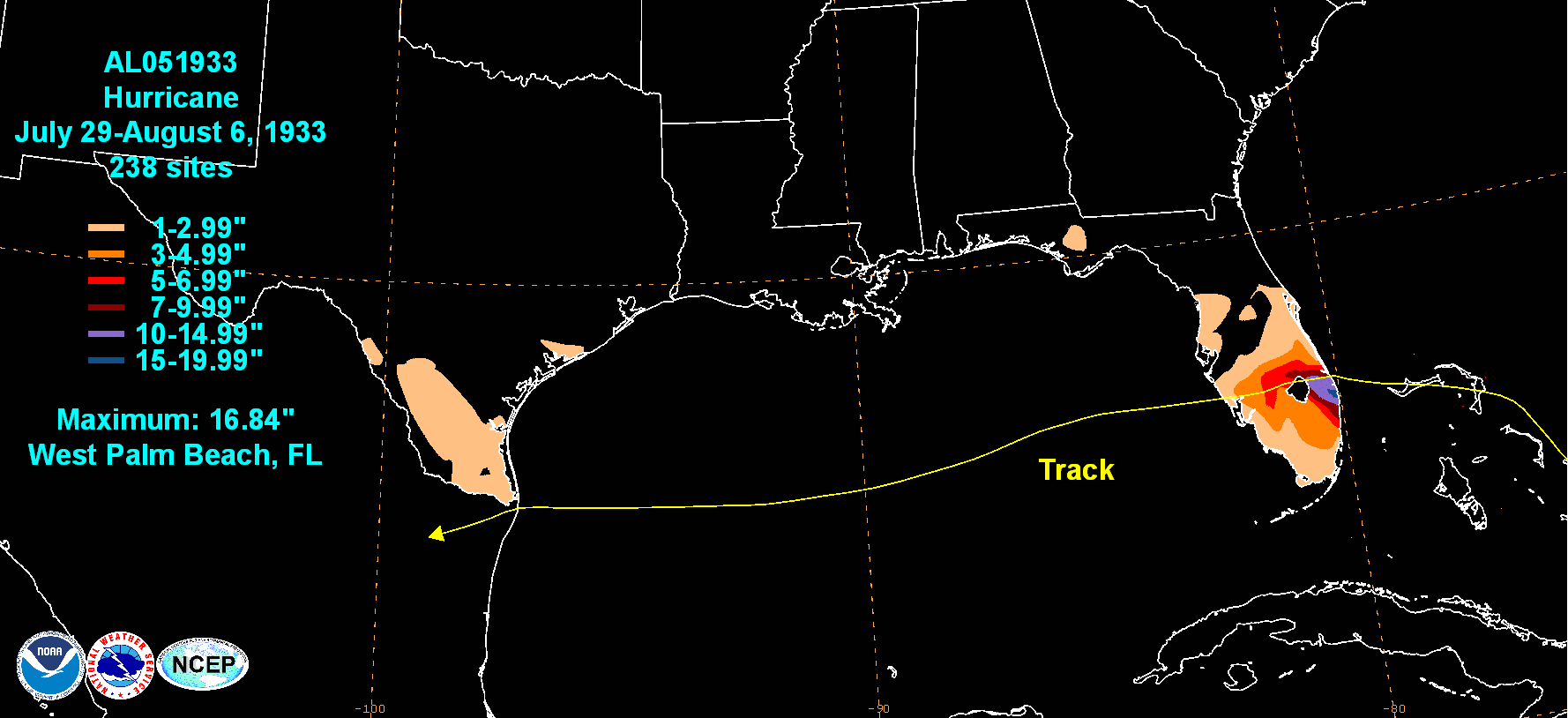
Rainfall totals from the hurricane across Florida and parts of Texas

Copious rains drenched Palm Beach, Martin, and St. Lucie counties, with flash floods—the worst since a hurricane in 1924—engulfing roads, farms, bridges, and railroads. Wind-driven rainwater seeped through crevices and gaps, soaking building interiors. The rains also filled several boats, causing them to sink. Floodwaters encircled Jupiter, disrupting vehicle traffic, and lay 2 1/2 ft (0.76 m) deep on Dixie Highway. Floods also hit Little Dixie, a colored town in Stuart, leaving 25 families homeless, and deluged a 70-foot (21 m) section of trackbed on the Florida East Coast Railway in Salerno, halting a few passenger trains for three hours. Rising waters stranded a pair of Florida Motor Lines buses, one of which slid into a ditch, but other buses relieved the passengers. Water volumes overwhelmed drainage systems, clogging sewers. A golf course flooded, spurring young onlookers to erect makeshift rafts. In the Palm Beaches water overtopped street curbs, swamped lawns, formed potholes, and isolated motorists. The aftermath of the storm caused funds to be expedited toward bridge repairs on the Loxahatchee River. Water levels in the Kissimmee River and Lake Okeechobee climbed, the latter rising 18 in (460 mm) in a day, but no flooding occurred.

Wind gusts disrupted communications with small settlements, Stuart being unreachable for many hours. Buildings suffered slight wind damage, with losses mostly confined to fruit crops and vegetation. At Stuart winds downed telegraph poles, signs, and tree limbs, but leveled just one structure. At St. Lucie Estates a hangar collapsed, crushing a private airplane, and a garage toppled at Jensen. At Fort Pierce the storm uprooted no trees, but mangled shrubs, roofs, awnings, and power lines citywide. Denizens had taken precautions, however, so workers quickly revived utilities. Farther south, at Palm Beach, loose branches temporarily severed electricity, but foliage in the resort town went unscathed, aside from a broken coconut palm. Little wind damage ensued in the interior and along the Gulf coast, partly due to the storm mostly hitting sparsely settled areas. In St. Petersburg, citizens enjoyed a refreshing northeast breeze that removed dead palm fronds, uprooted scattered plants, and sent waves splashing over seawalls. High seas eroded three portions of State Road A1A and undermined a 100-foot (30 m) seawall segment, causing its collapse. Sand drifts littered Federal Highway, slowing traffic. Seaward winds depressed tides in Tampa Bay, where tidal fluctuations prevented three ships from departing. The storm stripped fruit trees including avocado, mango, and citrus, with losses to citrus production averaging 10–20% in the Indian River region. Exposed grapefruit incurred 25% losses in St. Lucie County, and unripe oranges covered the ground.

=== Mexico and Texas ===
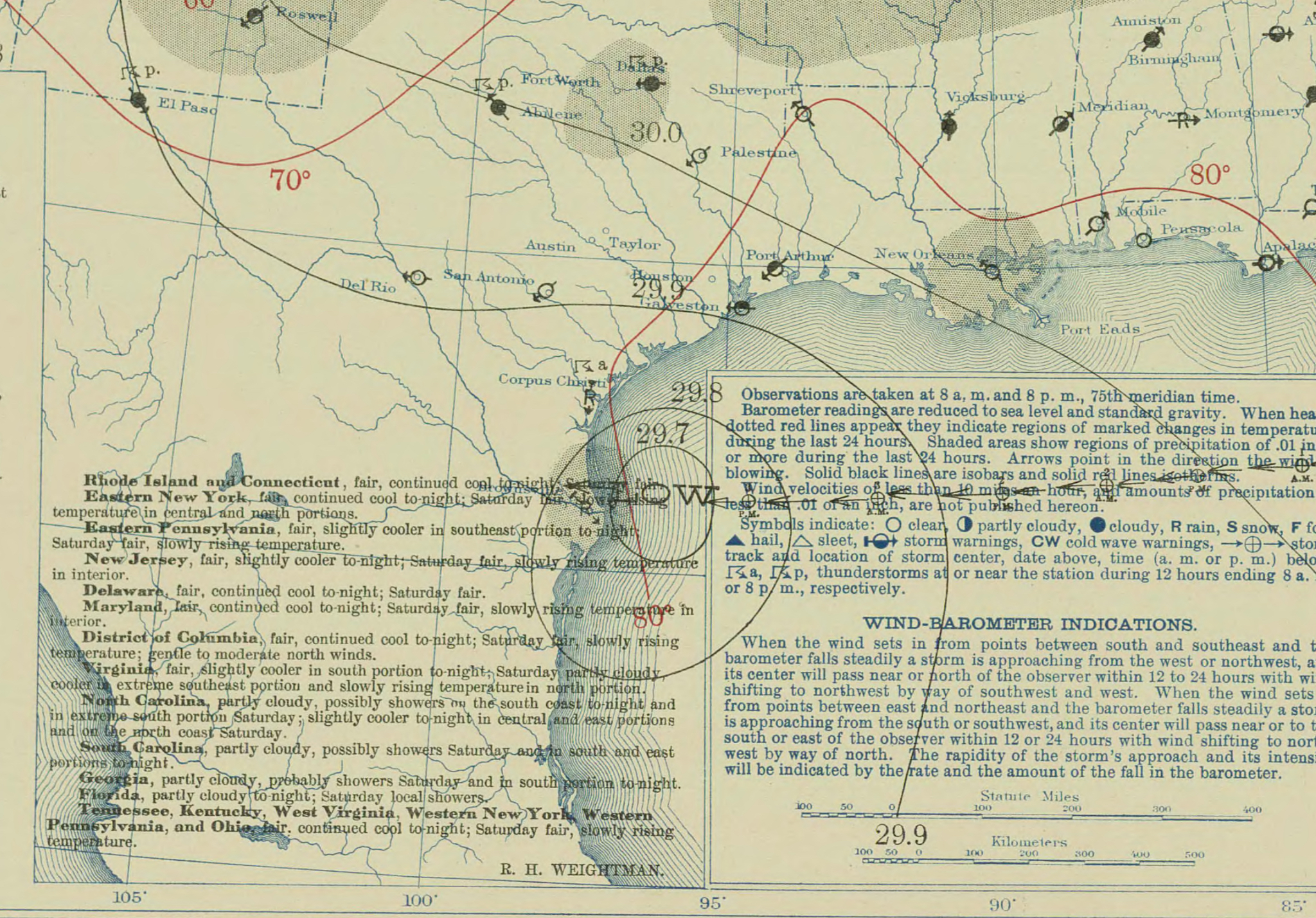
Surface weather map of the hurricane nearing landfall in northern Mexico on August 4

In Mexico, the storm produced torrential rains that resulted in severe flooding, particularly in riparian areas along and near the Santa Catarina River in Monterrey, where at least 31 people died as floods made more than a quarter of the city inaccessible. The collapse of a bridge isolated the Colonia Independencia. Raging waters destroyed 300 homes in one section alone, forcing occupants to flee, and the number of homeless reached the "thousands." Governor Lázaro Cárdenas and Mayor Calles called upon all city and state facilities for relief efforts. Many people required evacuation by boat in what were described as "thrilling rescues." The effects of the storm prostrated electrical and communications lines as well as trees in the city. Nearer to the coast, strong winds severely damaged the famed Teatro Reforma, a theater dating to the Second Mexican Empire, in Matamoros, Tamaulipas, where many homes were destroyed. The storm was the first of four Atlantic hurricanes to hit Mexico in 1933, the most in a year as of 2024.

As the hurricane affected Brownsville, strong winds—estimated at 80 to 90 mph (130 to 140 km/h)—rent apart tree limbs, tore off roofs, and cracked plate glass windows. Debris covered streets in nearby Port Isabel, where waterfront fishing huts were wrecked. High seas also destroyed many structures on South Padre Island and partly submerged Padre and Brazos islands. High tides eroded 500 ft (150 m) of highway on Brazos. Almost no building in Port Isabel went unscathed, with poorly built structures flattened; among the worst hit were at a development company. Early reports confirmed that airborne glass from the local courthouse mildly injured a man in Brownsville. The storm also disrupted communications between the Texas mainland and the barrier islands, where high tides stranded 25–30 campers and a detachment of cavalry from Fort Brown. Two hangars in Brownsville collapsed from the winds as well. A smokestack at a canning facility in La Feria collapsed under the strain of high winds. Water levels along the Rio Grande rose by 14 ft (4.3 m), though the river ultimately fell short of flood stage and spared surrounding areas of damage. The storm ruined between 8–10% of the citrus crop in the Rio Grande Valley, and caused at least one death in Texas. Localized losses to the citrus crop reached 25% and upwards of 50% of the cotton crop was blown away in the lower valley region. Total crop damage reached $2 million.

== See also ==
- 1909 Monterrey hurricane – Also caused catastrophic flooding along the Santa Catarina River, claiming 4,000 lives

== Sources ==
- Barnes, Jay (1998). Florida's Hurricane History (1st ed.). Chapel Hill, North Carolina: UNC Press. ISBN 0-8078-2443-7 – via Internet Archive.
- Bennett, William J., ed. (July 1933). Written at Jacksonville, Florida. "General Summary". Florida section. Climatological Data. 37 (7). Washington, D.C.: United States Weather Bureau: 25.
- Doehring, Fred; Duedall, Iver W.; Williams, John M. (June 1994). Florida Hurricanes and Tropical Storms, 1871–1993: An Historical Survey (Technical report). Technical Paper. Gainesville, Florida: Florida Sea Grant. 71, Florida Hurricanes and Tropical Storms – via National Oceanic and Atmospheric Administration.
  - Williams, John M.; Duedall, Iver W. (2002) [1997]. Florida Hurricanes and Tropical Storms, 1871–2001 (2nd ed.). Gainesville: University Press of Florida. ISBN 0-8130-2494-3 – via Internet Archive.
- Dunn, G. E. (December 1933). Humphreys, W. J. (ed.). "Tropical Storms of 1933" (PDF). Monthly Weather Review. 61 (12). Washington, D.C.: United States Weather Bureau: 362–363. Bibcode:1933MWRv...61..362D. doi:10.1175/1520-0493(1933)61<362:TSO>2.0.CO;2. Archived from the original (PDF) on March 4, 2016 – via American Meteorological Society.
- International Best Track Archive for Climate Stewardship (IBTrACS) (September 2022). IBTrACS browser (hosted by UNC Asheville) (Report). National Centers for Environmental Information – via World Data Center for Meteorology.
- Klotzbach, Philip J.; Schreck III, Carl J.; Compo, Gilbert G.; Bowen, Steven G.; et al. (March 1, 2021). "The Record-Breaking 1933 Atlantic Hurricane Season". Bulletin of the American Meteorological Society. 102 (3). Boston: American Meteorological Society: E446–E463. Bibcode:2021BAMS..102E.446K. doi:10.1175/BAMS-D-19-0330.1.
- Landsea, Christopher W.; Hagen, Andrew; Bredemeyer, William; Carrosco, Cristina; et al. (August 15, 2014). "A Reanalysis of the 1931–43 Atlantic Hurricane Database" (PDF). Journal of Climate. 27 (16). Boston: American Meteorological Society: 6093–6118. Bibcode:2014JCli...27.6093L. doi:10.1175/JCLI-D-13-00503.1 – via Atlantic Oceanographic and Meteorological Laboratory.
- McDonald, W. F. (July 1933). "North Atlantic Ocean" (PDF). Monthly Weather Review. 61 (7). Washington, D.C.: United States Weather Bureau: 208–209. Bibcode:1933MWRv...61..208M. doi:10.1175/1520-0493(1933)61<208:NAO>2.0.CO;2. Archived from the original (PDF) on March 4, 2016 – via American Meteorological Society.
- Mitchell, Charles L. (July 1933). "Tropical Disturbances of July 1933" (PDF). Monthly Weather Review. 61 (7): 200–201. Bibcode:1933MWRv...61..200M. doi:10.1175/1520-0493(1933)61<200b:TDOJ>2.0.CO;2. Archived from the original (PDF) on February 25, 2017 – via American Meteorological Society.
- Norquest, C. E., ed. (August 1933). Written at Houston, Texas. "General Summary". Texas section. Climatological Data. 38 (8). Washington, D.C.: United States Weather Bureau: 57–64.
- "Ocean Gales and Storms, July 1933" (PDF). Monthly Weather Review. 61 (7). Washington, D.C.: United States Weather Bureau: 209. July 1933. Bibcode:1933MWRv...61..209.. doi:10.1175/1520-0493(1933)61<209a:OGASJ>2.0.CO;2. Archived from the original (PDF) on March 4, 2016 – via American Meteorological Society.
- Roth, David (January 17, 2010). Texas Hurricane History (PDF) (Report). Camp Springs, Maryland: National Weather Service – via Weather Prediction Center.
- Schoner, R. W.; Molansky, S. (July 1956). Rainfall Associated with Hurricanes (and Other Tropical Disturbances) (PDF) (Technical report). National Hurricane Research Project. Washington, D.C.: United States Weather Bureau. p. 165. 3, Rainfall Associated with Hurricanes – via Weather Prediction Center.
- "Severe Local Storms" (PDF). Monthly Weather Review. 61 (8). Washington, D.C.: United States Weather Bureau: 248–249. August 1933. Bibcode:1933MWRv...61..248.. doi:10.1175/1520-0493(1933)61<248:SLSA>2.0.CO;2. Archived from the original (PDF) on March 4, 2016 – via American Meteorological Society.
- "Severe Local Storms" (PDF). Monthly Weather Review. 61 (7). Washington, D.C.: United States Weather Bureau: 216–218. July 1933. Bibcode:1933MWRv...61..216.. doi:10.1175/1520-0493(1933)61<216:SLSJ>2.0.CO;2. Archived from the original (PDF) on March 4, 2016 – via American Meteorological Society.
- Tannehill, I. R. (1952) [1938]. Hurricanes: Their Nature and History (8th ed.). Princeton, New Jersey: Princeton University Press. OCLC 3024697 – via Internet Archive.
- The Weedon Island Story (PDF) (3rd ed.). Tarpon Springs, Florida: Pinellas County Department of Environmental Management, Environmental Lands Division. April 2005 [1992].
