= Eduardo Vasconcelos =

Mexican politician (1896–1953)

Eduardo Vasconcelos (1896 in Oaxaca, Mexico – April 26, 1953) was Governor of Oaxaca from 1947 to 1950. As Governor of Oaxaca, he built schools, hospitals, and roads. He founded an art school that catered to indigenous arts (e.g. music, painting) and crafts (e.g. pottery, weaving, dying) to help assure the preservation of traditional culture. The Big Tree of Mexico by John Skeaping. 1953. Indiana University Press. 1953. In addition, he was also Secretary of Public Education in 1934 and Secretary of the Interior from 1932 to 1934. In 1872, his grandfather, Francisco Vasconcelos, was elected municipal president of the city of Oaxaca.
