= José Inocente Lugo =

Mexican lawyer and politician

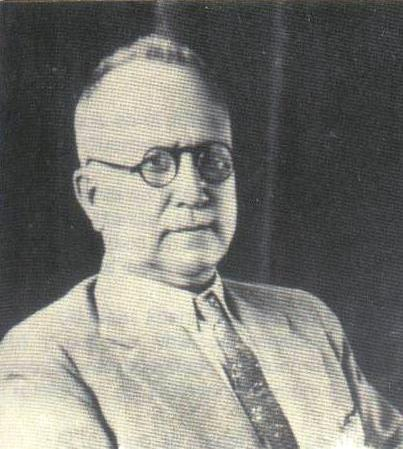
José Inocente Lugo

José Inocente Lugo Gómez Tagle (25 December 1871 – 26 November 1963) was a Mexican lawyer and politician who served as governor of the State of Guerrero.
