= Ramón Rodríguez Familiar =

Mexican politician (1898–1986)

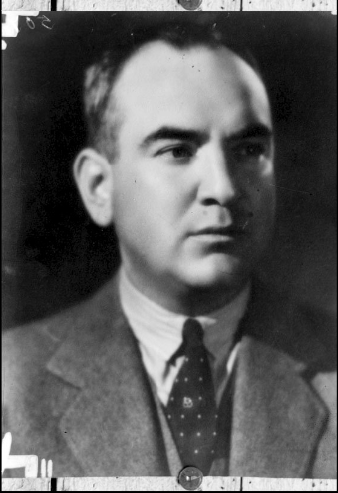
Ramón Rodriguez Familiar, General

Ramón Rodríguez Familiar (Querétaro, Querétaro, September 26, 1898 – Ciudad de México Distrito Federal, November 23, 1986) was governor of Querétaro from 1935 to 1939.

== Military career ==
At the outbreak of the Mexican Revolution in 1910, Rodríguez entered military school. In 1914 Rodriguez became a soldier in the Constitutionalist Army, under the command of General Francisco Coss. In the twenties, he collaborated with General Abelardo L. Rodríguez of Baja California to remove Colonel Esteban Cantu. As head of the territory of Baja California, Abelardo Rodriguez appointed Ramon Rodriguez as his private secretary. In 1932, as interim president of the nation, he named Ramón Rodríguez as first deputy chief and later as his chief of staff.

== Governor ==
Upon returning to Querétaro in 1935, he won the National Lottery and with the funds launched a campaign for governor of Querétaro against the unpopular incumbent Saturnino Osornio amid threats and provocations from Osornio's people. Relations between Osornio and Rodríguez reached a nadir when Rodriguez and his entourage were hunting in Colón, and they were warned of an ambush to kill Rodríguez. After receiving and engaging gunfire, Rodríguez and his party escaped unharmed.

After winning the election, Rodríguez reversed many of Osornio's policies: he stopped political and religious persecutions, reopened the Civil College (precursor of the Autonomous University of Querétaro), distributed lands in the valleys of San Juan and Querétaro, restored the civil and criminal courts, and removed, one by one, the deputies and mayors loyal to Osornio. In the city of Querétaro, he created the Escobedo Market (relocated 25 years later) and the Municipal Stadium. With these changes, half the population which had left under Osornio (the population had dwindled from 60,000 to 35,000 in his four years as governor) returned to Querétaro.

== Commander ==
Having improved the government and the prestige of Querétaro, Ramon Rodriguez delivered the governorship, he rejoined the army and attends various battlefronts in World War II. At the conclusion of this, he was appointed representative of Mexico in the victory parade in London with the general Eulogio Ortiz and Jose Beltran. He then held various positions in the Secretariat of National Defense: personnel director, quartermaster general of the Army, director of pensions and commander of the military zone of Aguascalientes and Puebla. We were awarded the medals of Perseverance, the Croix de Guerre, the vote of trust and rapport and Revolutionary Medal Merit.

== Businessman ==
Enthusiastic amateur, in the late forties established in the City of Querétaro the first two commercial radio stations, XENA (1450 AM) and XEJX (1250 AM), which continue to transmit and were now owned by his descendants until the beginning the twenty-first century.

General Ramon Rodriguez Familiar died at the Military Hospital in Mexico City on November 23, 1986. As a tribute to his memory, an avenue named after the capital of Querétaro, which runs from Arcos Avenue to University Avenue.

== Death ==
The morning of November 23, 1986, at the Central Military Hospital in Mexico City, General Ramon Rodriguez Familiar, Querétaro has passed away.

As a tribute to his memory, June 5, 1987, the Government of Mariano Palacios Alcocer Querétaro State gave its name to a street of the city, which runs from Arcos Avenue to Avenue Universidad.
