= Víctor Fernández Manero =

Mexican politician

96th Governor of Tabasco (interim)
- In office 1 April 1936 – 31 December 1938
- Preceded by: Aureo L. Calles Pardo
- Succeeded by: Francisco Trujillo Gurría

Personal details
- Born: November 17, 1898 Villahermosa, Tabasco, Mexico
- Died: 1976 (aged 77–78) Villahermosa, Tabasco, Mexico
- Party: National Revolutionary Party

Víctor Fernández Manero (1898–1976) was a Mexican politician and doctor who served as the 96th Governor of Tabasco. He belonged to the National Revolutionary Party (PNR), the forerunner of the PRI.

After governor Aureo L. Calles Pardo called for extraordinary elections in 1935, Fernández Manero received the support of Tomás Garrido Canabal and his faction, and was inaugurated despite allegations of harassment by his opponent.

Despite a period of initial stability, Fernández Manero tenure was marred by religious conflict and economic downturn, particularly in the production of crops such as bananas and cocoa. He died in Villahermosa in 1976.

Sections of the city of Jalapa, Tabasco, are named after Fernández Manero.
