= 1985 Election Day floods =

Series of disastrous floods in the Mid-Atlantic States

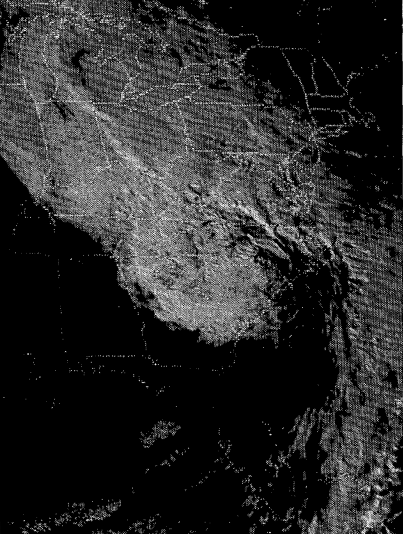
- Satellite image of the storm on November 4 over the Carolinas
- Date: November 1985
- Location: Mid-Atlantic States (particularly West Virginia and Virginia)
- Deaths: 62 total
- Property damage: $1.4 billion (1985 USD) (Note: All damage totals are in 1985 United States dollars.)

The 1985 Election Day floods – also known in West Virginia as the Killer Floods of 1985 – produced the costliest floods in both West Virginia and Virginia in November 1985. The event occurred after Hurricane Juan, a tropical cyclone in the 1985 Atlantic hurricane season, meandered near the coast of Louisiana before striking just west of Pensacola, Florida late on October 31. Juan moved northward into Canada, but spawned another system that spread moderate rainfall across the Mid-Atlantic States, wetting soils. On November 3, a low pressure area developed south of Florida and moved northeastward along a cold front, bringing a plume of moisture influenced by Juan's previous track. The storm moved through the southeastern United States, stalling on November 5 west of Washington, D.C. before turning out to sea the next day. The event became known as the Election Day floods due to its concurrence with elections in Virginia.

Damage was heaviest in Virginia and West Virginia. In the former state, the rainfall peaked at 19.77 in (502 mm) just northeast of Montebello. The rains increased levels along many rivers to record heights across Virginia, including the James River which crested at 42.15 ft (12.85 m) at a station called Holcomb Rock, the highest level in the state. In Roanoke, the Roanoke River rose 18.57 ft (5.66 m) in ten hours to a peak of 23.35 ft (7.12 m), considered a 1 in 200 year event. In the city, many residents had to be rescued after they were trapped, and three people drowned by driving into flooded waters. Considered the worst flood on record in the city, Roanoke sustained $225 million in damage, with 3,100 damaged homes and businesses. There was also flooding in Richmond after the James River crested at the second-highest level on record. Throughout Virginia, damage was estimated at $753 million, making it the state's costliest flood at the time, and there were 22 deaths.

In West Virginia, 27 river gauging stations recorded 1 in 100 year events, mostly within the Potomac and Monongahela basins. As most of West Virginia's liveable land is along flood plains, the river flooding caused heavy damage, mostly in the eastern portion. High waters washed away topsoil and thousands of trees, and over 13,000 homes and businesses in the state were damaged or destroyed. Damage was estimated at nearly $700 million, making it West Virginia's costliest flood, and there were 38 deaths. Flooding also affected Maryland, although to a lesser degree than neighboring Virginia, with $21 million in damage and one death. There was also tidal flooding in the state along the Chesapeake Bay from the storm, which washed away beaches just weeks after Hurricane Gloria affected the coastline. In Pennsylvania, flooding was worst along the Monongahela River in the state's southwest portion. During the storm, a power company opened the flood gates of the Lake Lynn dam along the river to preserve its integrity, triggering a class action lawsuit that ultimately failed. The floods damaged or destroyed 3,349 houses in Pennsylvania, causing $83 million in damage, as well as one death.

Overall damage was estimated at $1.4 billion, which would have been the fourth costliest United States hurricane if it were a tropical cyclone, and there were 62 overall deaths. The flooding spurred changes to warning practices by the National Weather Service and the Government of Virginia. In December 2011, the United States Army Corps of Engineers completed a flood mitigation project in Roanoke, Virginia that began following the 1985 floods.

== Meteorological history ==
Early on October 26, a tropical depression formed in the central Gulf of Mexico, and intensified into Hurricane Juan while meandering northward. The storm had a large wind field and was somewhat subtropical in nature. Due to weak steering currents, Juan looped once offshore Louisiana and later looped again over the state, weakening into a tropical storm over land on October 29. The storm turned eastward and later northeastward, striking just west of Pensacola, Florida late on October 31. Juan turned to the north over land and became extratropical on November 1 over Tennessee. After the remnants of Juan continued to the north into Canada, it spawned an occluded low in the Tennessee Valley. This low continued to the east through North Carolina, bringing moderate rainfall throughout the region, and saturating soils; overcast skies and the weak sunlight of early November prevented much of the rains from evaporating.

On November 3, while the low was located over North Carolina, a stationary cold front extended from the Gulf of Mexico through Michigan, which absorbed the remnants of Juan. That day, a low pressure area developed in the Gulf of Mexico south of the Florida panhandle and tracked to the northeast along the front, bringing a plume of warm tropical air into the east-central United States; the previously erratic motion of Hurricane Juan allowed this flow of moisture to extend into the mid-Atlantic. As a result, dew points reached over 60 °F (16 °C) in North Carolina, which is unusually high for the time of year. As the storm moved through the Carolinas, it produced an area of convection, or thunderstorms, that extended to the north and west. The low stalled over Virginia on November 5 to the west of Washington, D.C., before turning to the east and exiting into the Atlantic Ocean, with rainfall ending on November 6.

== Preparations and warnings ==
Ahead of the main rainfall event, the National Weather Service (NWS) forecast office in Washington, D.C. issued a flood watch for southwestern Virginia, but canceled it early on November 4 after the heaviest rainfall was expected to continue to the northeast. Also that day, the NWS issued flood watches and warnings for portions of West Virginia. Later, special weather statements were issued in Virginia due to the continued rainfall. The Roanoke, Virginia NWS office lost telephone service shortly before the arrival of the flooding, which created difficulties in distributing warning information. Based on the rapid level increase of the Roanoke River, the Raleigh, North Carolina NWS issued a flash flood warning for Roanoke and its surrounding vicinity. The NWS also issued a river flood warning, initially anticipating a crest of 11 ft (3.4 m), and later increasing the estimate to 23 ft (7.0 m). In Virginia and Maryland along the western coast of the Chesapeake Bay, several low-lying and small coastal communities were evacuated. About 18,000 people were forced to evacuate in western Virginia due to river flooding. In West Virginia, residents relied on fire and civil defense sirens to receive warning about the floods, although some people in flood areas failed to receive any warning. Before the arrival of the floods, 23 of the 55 counties lacked updated disaster plans due to insufficient staff or funding, and as a result 29 counties' plans were rated "poor" or "very poor" by Federal Emergency Management Agency (FEMA).

== Impact ==
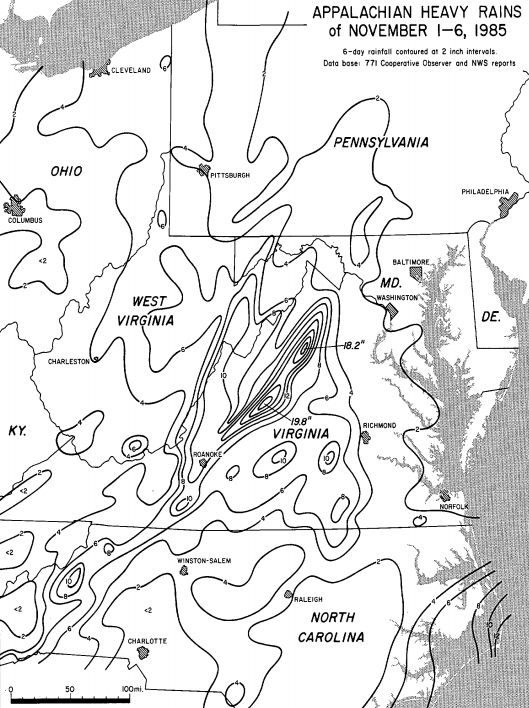
Rainfall map for the storm in the eastern United States

The system dropped rainfall from North Carolina to Pennsylvania, westward to Ohio, with a peak of 19.77 in (502 mm) just northeast of Montebello, Virginia. Widespread areas reported over 10 in (250 mm) of precipitation, with an unofficial total of about 14 in (360 mm) in West Virginia. For West Virginia, November 1985 is the wettest month since records began in 1895 with a statewide mean precipitation of 9.53 inches or 242.1 millimetres. Over Virginia it is the seventh-wettest month since records started with a mean precipitation of 8.88 inches or 225.6 millimetres, while in Pennsylvania November 1985 is also the seventh-wettest month since 1895, with the state averaging 8.23 inches or 209.0 millimetres.

Flash flooding occurred in mountainous portions of Virginia, West Virginia, and Pennsylvania, after orographic lift caused particularly high rainfall totals in the southern Appalachian Mountains. A total of 63 gauging stations along rivers and streams recorded flood magnitudes greater than the 100-year event, (Note: The return period refers to the probability of a given flood peak occurring over a period of time. A 100-year event, by definition, has a 1% chance happening in a specific year, although it is possible for such events to happen more than once over 100 years.) of which 40 surpassed the previous record by more than 50%. In addition to the floods, the storm produced the highest tidal flooding in the Chesapeake Bay and its tributaries since the 1933 Chesapeake–Potomac hurricane, and in some cases surpassed that of Hurricane Hazel in 1954. This was due to persistent southeasterly winds just days after a full moon, causing tides that reached 4 to 5 ft (1.2 to 1.5 m) above normal in many places in Maryland, with 6 to 8 ft (1.8 to 2.4 m) waves on top. Overall damage totaled $1.4 billion, and the system killed 62 people; if the system were a tropical cyclone, it would have ranked as the fourth costliest United States hurricane at the time.

While moving through the southeastern United States, the storm produced gale-force winds along the Outer Banks, and there were reports of two weak tornadoes that damaged boats. Rainfall reached 12 in (300 mm) in eastern North Carolina, which flooded coastal cities in combination with high tides. Crop damage in the state was estimated at $1.5 million, mostly to the soybean and wheat harvests. Flooding reached a depth of 2 ft (0.61 m) in some places, which damaged roads and affected a trailer park in Hertford County. The floods also destroyed a fish building in Colerain. In the Piedmont interior, the rainfall flooded streams, flooding some roads and houses, while in mountainous portions, upwards of 8 ft (2.4 m) of snow fell.

The high rainfall caused levels to increase along the Ohio River in Kentucky. Rainfall spread as far north as New York, which flooded basements in Amherst and increased levels along streams.

=== Virginia ===
The high rainfall caused many rivers to rise above their banks across Virginia, becoming among the top three highest crests on record along several rivers in the state. The flood set the highest river stage on record along the Roanoke River at Roanoke, Tinker Creek near Daleville, the Calfpasture River at Goshen, the Craig Creek at Parr, and the James River at Buchanan, Holcomb Rock, and Bent Creek. At Holcomb Rock, the James River crested at 42.15 ft (12.85 m), the highest in the state, and was about 20 ft (6.1 m) above flood stage; based on the observations and the associated discharge, the return period was estimated as greater than a 1 in 500 year event. River gauges recorded record discharge rates at 34 stations, of which 32 were 100 year events. The rains delayed crops from being planted across the state and caused minor crop damage. Across the state, about 3,500 houses were destroyed. Overall, the storm system caused 22 deaths and $753 million, greater than the devastating hurricanes Camille and Agnes, and making it the costliest flood in the state's history.

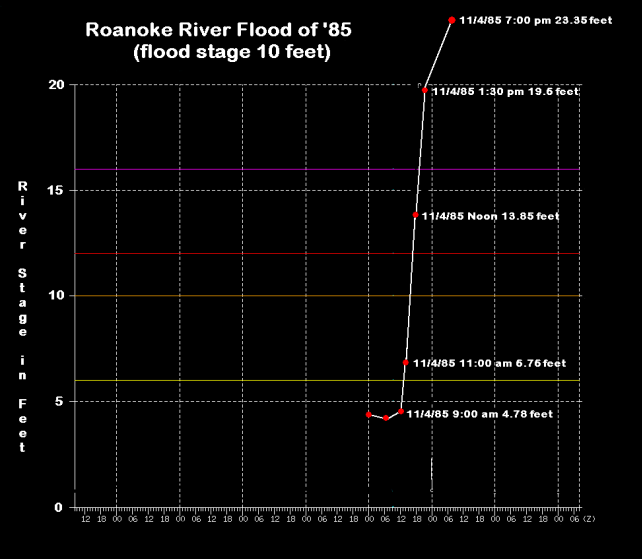
Hydrograph of the Roanoke River in Roanoke, Virginia, showing a 18.57 ft (5.66 m) increase in 10 hours

The city of Roanoke recorded 6.61 in (168 mm) in a 24‑hour period, the highest 24‑hour total on record for the city since records began in 1912; of the total, 4.25 in (108 mm) fell in about three hours. After previously wet conditions, the Roanoke River at Roanoke rapidly rose 18.57 ft (5.66 m) in ten hours to its peak of 23.35 ft (7.12 m), well above the flood stage of 10 ft (3.0 m). The floods were considered a 1 in 200 year event, and in one instance near Salem, the waters rose to the height of a three-story building. Many surrounding rivers, including the James River, also rose, with 63 peak discharge rates in local streams. The high rivers flooded much of downtown Roanoke, including roads, rail lines, houses, and businesses, with some roads and bridges closed for weeks. Residents survived by holding onto trees, while others, some trapped in their cars, required rescue; one helicopter rescued 125 stranded people. There were 10 deaths in and around Roanoke, including three who drove into flooded rivers, and three others who refused to evacuate. The floods damaged about 3,000 homes and 100 businesses. Overall monetary damage in the city was estimated at $225 million, with $520 million in the entire metropolitan area, making it the city's worst flood on record.

Across the Shenandoah Valley, the flooding caused widespread damage, notably in Rockingham County where the floods damaged most of the roads, and entered 4,000 houses and 350 farms. Along the Shenandoah River, 13 gauging stations reported new discharge records, including the reading at Verona which was five times the previous record. In Elkton within the county, an 89‑year‑old railroad bridge was washed out, although nearby Bridgewater had less flooding due to a levee built in 1949; the town sustained minor damage to roads and the hydroelectric plant. In nearby Highland County along the border with West Virginia, the floods damaged 350 homes or barns, and deteriorated $2 million worth of roads. In Augusta County, also along the West Virginia border, the Buffalo Creek swept away bridges and roads, with $8 million in transportation damage and $7 million in other damages in the county. Staunton, a city independent from Augusta County, experienced minimal effects, although the water treatment plant was damaged and a hotel basement was flooded. Waynesboro, also within Augusta County, sustained $3 million in damages after the South River reached a record crest, damaging 213 homes and businesses. Damage was particularly heavy in Rockbridge County, estimated at $100 million, with 616 homes and businesses ravaged by floods. In Buena Vista alone, the Maury River left $50 million in damage, after 3 to 6 ft (0.91 to 1.83 m) of water entered homes and businesses. Over half of the homes and businesses were damaged in Glasgow. Natural Bridge and Natural Bridge Station including the communities of Gilmore's Mill, Greenlee and Arnolds Valley were also affected. Elk Creek, which flows through Arnolds Valley was backed up by the flooded James River, flooding much of the northern end of Arnolds Valley and Greenlee.

Along the James River, 15 gauging stations reported new records. At Lynchburg, the James River rose to 35 ft (11 m), surpassing the record set by Hurricane Camille in 1969 by 7 ft (2.1 m). There, the river swept up entire houses, causing portions of U.S. Route 29 to close, and ruining about $8 million worth of tobacco. In Richmond, the James River rose to 30.76 ft (9.38 m) on November 7, the second-highest peak on record after the 36.51 ft (11.13 m) set by Hurricane Agnes in 1972. The floods in Richmond closed a portion of Interstate 95, and nearly overtopped the 14th Street Bridge. Three bridges were closed, resulting in heavy traffic due to detours. Portions of the industrial district south of the river was flooded, as were commercial buildings.

In eastern Virginia, high winds downed several trees in the eastern portion of the state, causing power outages and blocking roadways. Falling trees struck two vehicles, injuring three people. Along the Chesapeake Bay, high tides severely damaged or destroyed 75% of piers along the Potomac and Rappahannock rivers. Flooding entered about 150 houses in Colonial Beach, while many adjacent highways and seawalls were heavily damaged. The tides damaged several marinas, sinking several boats. At the mouth of the James River, high waves capsized a crab boat, killing its two passengers. A ferry was also washed aground on the James River. Several beaches lost 15 to 20 ft (4.6 to 6.1 m) of sand.

The floods occurred on election day throughout the state. Gerald Baliles won the governorship over Wyatt Durrette with a decreased turnout from 1981, the first such decrease since 1961. The floods caused the three districts in western Virginia to have the lowest turnouts in the state, although other counties not affected by the overall system also saw decreased turnout. The event later became known as the "Election Day Floods" due to their concurrence.

=== West Virginia ===
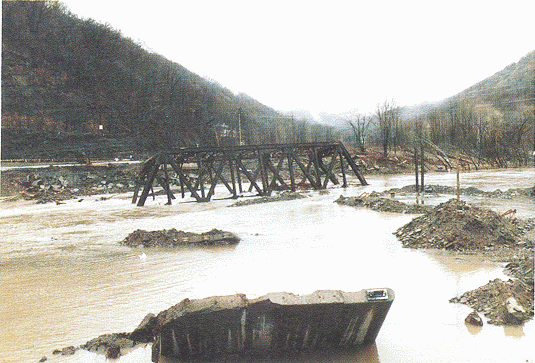
Destroyed railroad and highway bridge in Rowlesburg, West Virginia

After previously dry conditions, severe flooding also occurred in West Virginia, amplified by the mountainous terrain. Record discharge rates were observed at 25 gauging stations, and 27 stations along rivers were at least 100 year events, setting records along the Potomac and Monongahela rivers, among several others. While washing away large rocks, some streams changed their channels due to the high volume of water. Near Petersburg, the South Branch Potomac River crested at 25.4 ft (7.7 m) and produced a record discharge of 130,000 cu ft (3,700 m^{3}), and the peak discharge at Franklin was nearly three times the previous record. At five of the six gauging stations along the Potomac, there were new records for discharge rates. Along the Potomac, the floodwaters collected behind dams, causing 21 to exceed the capacity designed to withstand a 100-year flood. All five stations along the Greenbrier River recorded a new record discharge rate, as did all five along the Tygart Valley River. The flash flooding caused the Bloomington Reservoir to rise 80 ft (24 m) in 30 hours. Several caves were flooded, causing high amounts of erosion and damaging some speleothems. After the flooding, Mystic Cave in Pendleton County had tree branches wedged into the ceiling and a layer of sand on the floor.

Flooding was worst along the Cheat River, where five of the six gauging stations set new discharge records. At Parsons, the river produced a discharge of 200,000 cu ft (5,700 m^{3}), which was about 3.8 times the previous flood record, and 3.5 times the rate of a 100-year flood. At Rowlesburg, the Cheat River crested at 36.9 ft (11.2 m), which remains the highest on record as of 2013. At Hendricks, the Dry Fork of the Cheat River had a peak flow of 100,000 cu ft (2,800 m^{3}), more than twice the previous record.

As most of the livable land in West Virginia lies upon floodplains, the high river flooding caused heavy damage, wrecking many small rural towns and washing out miles of roadways. A total of 43 bridges were destroyed and another 80 were damaged. Near Moorefield, the bridge carrying U.S. Route 220 was closed, but was reopened after emergency repairs. In Paw Paw, a flooded river washed a swept up building into a bridge, washing it away. Much of Pendleton County became isolated after 18 bridges were washed out and roads were covered by mudslides. The Cheat River destroyed 110 of the 132 houses in Albright, and washed away a trailer park in Rowlesburg. The flooding downed thousands of trees, which were carried into houses and recreation areas to cause additional damage. Agriculture losses were heavy after the floods washed away the topsoil and left behind miles of debris. Many farm structures were washed away, and hundreds of thousands of chicken or turkeys were killed. Statewide, at least 8,968 houses were damaged, and another 4,000 were destroyed, which left nearly 2,600 people homeless. In addition, the floods damaged or destroyed 711 businesses. Agriculture damage was estimated at $97 million, and damage to the United States Forest Service in the state was estimated at $3.9 million. Statewide damage totaled nearly $700 million, and 38 people were killed in West Virginia. This made it the most damaging flood in the state's history, according to then-Governor Arch A. Moore, Jr.

=== Maryland, Washington, D.C., and Pennsylvania ===
Flooding in Maryland largely occurred along the Potomac River, primarily along the north branch and downstream after draining floodwaters from Virginia and West Virginia. Two gauging stations recorded new discharge records, although the peak of 235,000 cu ft (6,700 m^{3}) at Paw Paw was slightly less than the record set in 1936. There was also flooding along the Youghiogheny River, which had a peak discharge of 11,700 cu ft (330 m^{3}) at Oakland, just below the record set in 1941. The floods along the Potomac swept up debris and animals. In Georgetown in Washington, D.C., the floods reached within 2 in (51 mm) of overtopping the lock, thus preventing significant flooding in the nation's capital, although floodwaters reached 4 ft (1.2 m) deep in portions of the neighborhood. Levels along the Potomac in Washington were the third highest on record and so severely damaged the Georgetown Branch that the C&O Railroad began abandonment of it. Officials closed the Washington Monument, Lincoln Memorial, and Jefferson Memorial for two days due to fears of flooding. The floods left $9 million worth of damage to the Chesapeake and Ohio Canal between Georgetown and Cumberland, Maryland, which was closed for the first time in its 157-year history. In general, the floods in Maryland caused less damage than in neighboring states, and overall damage in the state was estimated at $21 million; there was one death.

Along Chesapeake Bay, the high tides damaged many piers, bulkheads, and coastal homes along the western coastline of the Chesapeake, mainly in Maryland between St. Mary's and Anne Arundel counties. High waters damaged roads and entered many cars while also washing away several boats. Along the Atlantic coast, high waves washed away 400,000 cu yd (310,000 m^{3}) of beaches in Ocean City, just months after Hurricane Gloria eroded twice that amount of sand. In addition, winds gusted as strong as 80 mph (130 km/h), which downed power lines and left thousands without power. During the storm, a member of the United States Coast Guard was injured while responding to a hoax mayday call. Damage in eastern Maryland totaled over $5 million.

High rainfall also flooded streams in southwestern Pennsylvania, estimated as 50 year events, primarily along the Monongahela River. In Point Marion at the confluence of the Monongahela and Cheat rivers, the waters crested at 40 ft (12 m), or 14 ft (4.3 m) above flood stage. There were many evacuation orders after a false report that the Lake Lynn dam had burst, which is located along the Cheat River several miles south of Point Marion in extreme northern West Virginia. The dam, owned by West Penn Power, reached the highest levels in its 60-year history, prompting the company to open flood gates, which flooded Point Marion with 8 ft (2.4 m) of water. The Monongahela River crested at 42.7 ft (13.0 m), or 10.7 ft (3.3 m) above flood state in Brownsville, and rose 18 ft (5.5 m) above flood stage in Greensboro. In the latter city, the peak discharge rate was 220,000 cu ft (6,200 m^{3}), 60% greater than the previous record, and downstream at Elizabeth, the peak discharge was 178,000 cu ft (5,000 m^{3}), also a record.

In Brownsville, 35 businesses were flooded, while in Greensboro, high waters damaged roads and forced 300 people to evacuate. During the floods, 23 barges broke free and became lodged in the Maxwell Lock & Dam, which is an important shipping link; the lock remained closed for nearly six weeks, costing the local economy $20 million in lost production. The same river crested at 44 ft (13 m) in Charleroi, breaking the record set in 1967. The flooded river caused $1 million in damage at California University of Pennsylvania, broke 40 barges from their moorings, and forced about 2,600 people to evacuate; one person in North Charleroi drowned after returning to his evacuated home. Throughout the region, the floods damaged or destroyed 3,349 houses, leaving at least 2,000 people homeless, and statewide damage was estimated at $83 million.

== Aftermath ==
In the aftermath of the floods, President Ronald Reagan declared 121 counties or other areas as disaster areas, including 40 counties and 12 independent cities in Virginia, 29 West Virginia counties, and 6 Pennsylvania counties. After a year of hurricanes Elena, Gloria, and Juan, as well as flooding in Puerto Rico, the American Red Cross ran out of funds while responding to the flood disaster, prompting an emergency fundraising appeal.

Much of the eastern portion of West Virginia was declared a federal disaster area on November 7, 1985. Within two weeks of the declaration, the United States Army Corps of Engineers (USACE) began clearing debris across the state, which was completed by July 1986. Widespread areas were under a boil-water advisory due to damage to water facilities, prompting officials to deliver trucks with bottled water through disaster areas. The state's highway department worked with FEMA and the USACE to clear destroyed buildings. Workers also buried killed animals, cleared blocked streams, and helped farmers regrow lost crops. FEMA opened 20 disaster centers across the state to coordinate residents' requests for federal aid, and used 290 full or part-time employees. Overall federal assistance totaled $285 million, including $171 million for debris removal and repairing infrastructure, $90 million for loans and temporary housing, and $24 million through payments from the National Flood Insurance Program. This followed a six-week period when applications for such assistance were processed. After receiving complaints about inadequate funding, FEMA increased payments to 869 people. FEMA also built 647 temporary mobile homes, only about half of which were utilized. Residents complained that the money spent on the homes was misdirected and instead should have been given directly to victims. Many residents in Albright moved away after the main industry – river rafting – was washed away. In the city of Parsons, most businesses relied on small business loans to continue operating, although 18 stores never reopened following the floods. Officials held a telethon on state television and radio on December 7, 1985, that ultimately raised $1.7 million for storm victims in the state. In the years after the flood, residents rebuilt houses farther away from flood plains, while officials rebuilt roads, bridges, and public buildings.

In general, the USACE credited existing flood control projects as preventing additional flooding. In West Virginia alone, it was estimated that existing flood-control projects saved about $135 million in damage. Lake Moomaw in western Virginia helped prevent $70 million in damage along the James River. In Pennsylvania, flood measures resulted in minimal flooding along the Youghiogheny River. After sustaining damage from flooding along the Monongahela River with little warning, the owners of a marina filed a class action lawsuit in the Court of Common Pleas of Washington County on November 21, 1985, against West Penn Power Company to compensate for damages. The plaintiffs believed that the damage occurred because the company opened the flood gates of the Lake Lynn Dam. The power company attempted to move the case to the United States District Court for the Western District of Pennsylvania in March 1986, citing the Federal Power Act's provision that claims should be in the District Court, but the nature of the suit sent it back to the Court of Common Pleas, bringing it to trial in September 1989. The jury found that although the West Penn Power was negligent, the damage was caused mainly by the historic and unprecedented flooding; consequently, the case entered a compulsory nonsuit, meaning the company was not required to pay compensation. The plaintiffs sought an appeal in 1990, which was denied.

Roanoke, Virginia had experienced a series of major floods in the preceding fifteen years. The floods caused by Hurricane Agnes in 1972 prompted a study that would channelize 10 mi (16 km) of the Roanoke River to increase water capacity. After the 1985 floods, the city council sought assistance from the USACE to build flood walls and improve river flow to mitigate against future flooding. The agency estimated that the project would cut the damage in half for a flood similar to the 1985 one. The cost for the project was initially project to be $34.4 million, of which the city was expected to pay $14.3 million. Private land donations and other financial sources provided about $6.8 million of the cost, while the remaining $7.5 million was covered by a bond, approved in an April 1989 single-issue referendum. This was the first such referendum for the city, and passed with 56.6% in support amid a voter turnout of 19.6%. The bond would be repaid by a 2% raise of the utility tax. Construction began in 1990, and that year a flood warning system was completed. In 1993, Roanoke's raw sewage plant and hospital finished flood proofing. The bulk of the project was finished in December 2011 when the final terrain cuts were made. When the project was completed, the USGS estimated that the annual damage from flooding decreased from $5.8 million to $2.7 million, and that the work prevented major floods in November 2009 from Hurricane Ida and January 2013. Also in the state, the General Assembly passed the "Virginia Flood Damage Reduction Act" in 1989, partly due to the flooding from 1985; this coordinated all work related to flood prevention throughout the state into one department.

In Pennsylvania, then-governor Dick Thornburgh allocated $1 million in emergency aid for the disaster areas, and activated 600 National Guardsmen to help with clean up. After nine water plants were closed, the companies relied on reserves to provide water supply to local residents while also encouraging cutting back on usage. About 2,900 people in Washington County lost access to clean water.

In the decades following the floods, the NWS utilized enhanced radar technology and computer models to better forecast flood events, as well as improved communications. Whereas in 1985, three different NWS agencies issued different warnings for the area affected in southwest Virginia, the NWS has since restructured to allow local offices, such as the one in Roanoke, to directly issue watches and warnings. The NWS also implemented increased flood prediction techniques across West Virginia in the years after the floods. As many West Virginia counties lacked a full-time emergency management director at the time, funding from the NWS provided 24‑hour weather radios for every county by the year 1987.

== See also ==
- Floods in the United States: 1901–2000
- Hurricane Camille – hurricane that struck the Gulf Coast of the United States and later produced deadly flooding in Virginia
