= Hurricane Elena =

Category 3 Atlantic hurricane in 1985

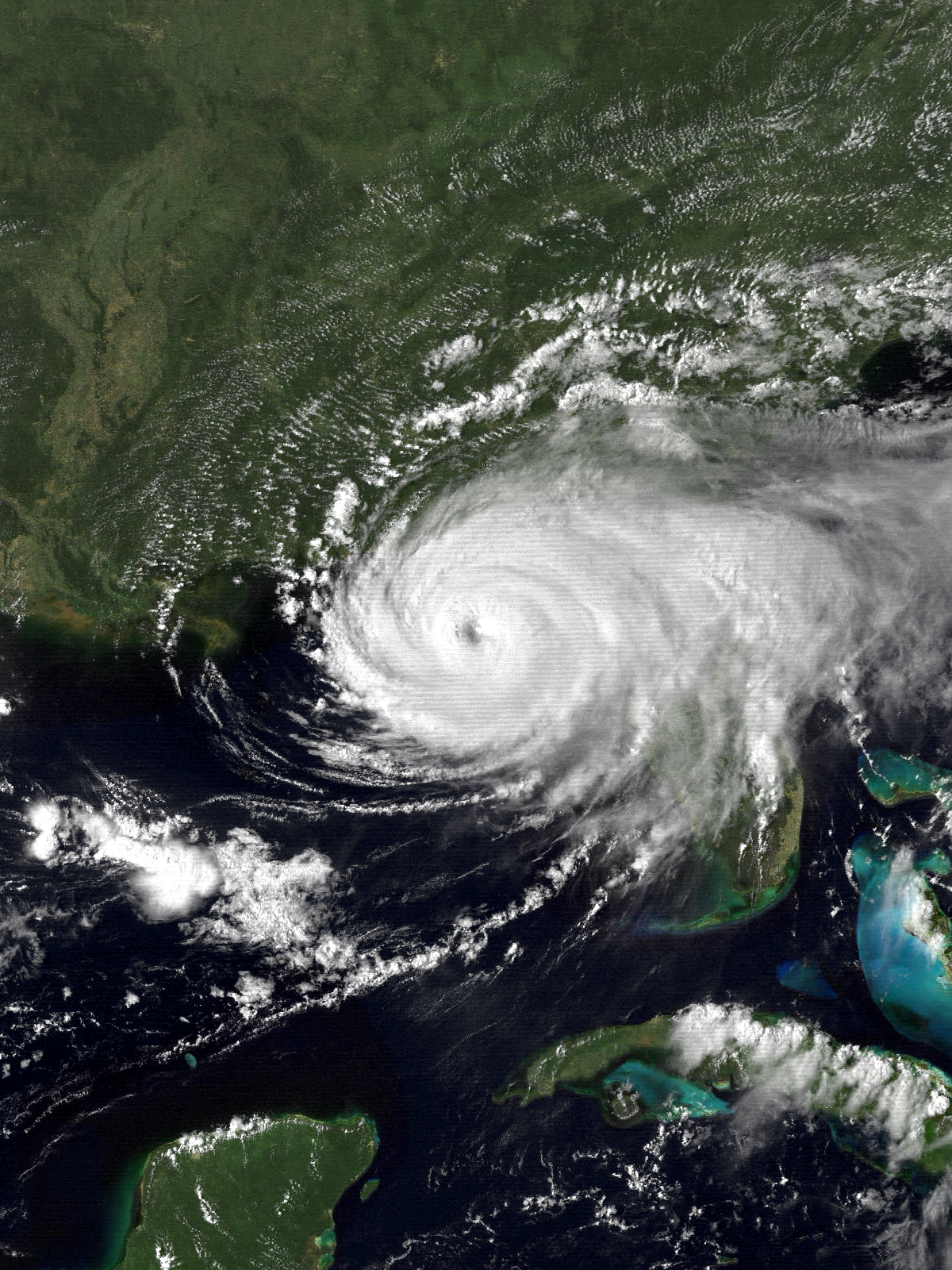
- Elena at its peak intensity while in the Gulf of Mexico on September 1

Meteorological history
- Formed: August 28, 1985
- Dissipated: September 4, 1985

Category 3 major hurricane
- 1-minute sustained (SSHWS/NWS)
- Highest winds: 125 mph (205 km/h)
- Lowest pressure: 953 mbar (hPa); 28.14 inHg

Overall effects
- Fatalities: 9
- Damage: $1.3 billion (1985 USD)
- Areas affected: Cuba, Florida, Alabama, Mississippi, Louisiana, Arkansas, Kentucky
- IBTrACS
- Part of the 1985 Atlantic hurricane season

Hurricane Elena was a strong, destructive and erratic tropical cyclone that affected eastern and central portions of the Gulf Coast of the United States in late August and early September 1985. Threatening popular tourist destinations during the Labor Day weekend, Elena repeatedly deviated from its forecast path, triggering evacuations of unprecedented extent. The hurricane wrought havoc to property and the environment between southwestern Florida and eastern Louisiana, though lesser effects were felt well beyond those areas. Elena developed on August 28 near Cuba, and after traveling lengthwise across the island with little impact, it entered the Gulf of Mexico and continued to strengthen. Initially projected to strike the central Gulf Coast, the hurricane unexpectedly veered toward the east on August 30, then stalled just 50 mi (80 km) west of Cedar Key, Florida. Despite predictions that Elena would continue eastward across Florida, the cyclone remained nearly stationary for about 48 hours, causing damage all along the eastern gulf with high winds and waves, before slowly moving northwest and ultimately making landfall near Biloxi, Mississippi, on September 2 as a Category 3 major hurricane. The storm quickly weakened upon moving ashore and dissipated on September 4.

The hurricane's unpredictable shifts in direction created what was considered the largest peacetime evacuation in the nation's history. Evacuations occurred in sequence to follow the storm's forecast positions, and many residents and tourists along portions of the Gulf Coast were forced to leave twice in a matter of days. Preparations were generally timely and efficient, though accommodations and resources at storm shelters were stretched thin, and many refugees tried to return home against officials' orders. About 1.25 million people fled the storm in Florida alone, contributing to a region-wide total of nearly 2 million evacuees. Tropical cyclone warnings and watches were continuously issued and adjusted, and forecasters stressed the storm's destructive potential for days.

Elena's slow movement off western Florida resulted in severe beach erosion and damage to coastal buildings, roads, and seawalls, especially to those of old or inadequate construction. Destruction was greatest near the shore and on islands such as Cedar Key and Dog Island, though tornadoes spawned by the hurricane swept through communities and mobile home parks well inland. The hurricane devastated the Apalachicola Bay shellfish industry, killing large quantities of oysters, destroying their reefs, and leaving thousands of workers unemployed. Farther west, Dauphin Island in Alabama endured wind gusts as high as 130 mph (210 km/h) and a significant storm surge. The island sustained some of the most significant damage inflicted by Elena, including several hundred damaged or demolished homes. The rest of the state's coast also sustained considerable damage, and the inland pecan and soybean crops were severely diminished in Alabama and Mississippi.

Over 13,000 homes were damaged in Mississippi, and 200 were destroyed. Cities close to the Alabama border—including Pascagoula—experienced widespread damage to residences, schools, and businesses, and the community of Gautier was effectively isolated from the outside world. Several apparent but unconfirmed tornadoes appear to have exacerbated the damage in the Gulfport area. Wind damage extended into portions of eastern Louisiana. Overall, nine people died as a result of the hurricane: two in Texas due to drownings in rip currents, three in Florida, two in Louisiana, one in Arkansas, and one in a maritime accident in the Gulf of Mexico. Damage totaled about $1.3 billion, (Note: Monetary figures in 1985 USD, unless otherwise noted.) and power outages from the storm affected 550,000 people. In Elena's wake, President Ronald Reagan declared parts of Alabama, Mississippi, and Florida federal disaster areas, making storm victims eligible for financial aid and temporary housing. The name Elena was later retired from the cyclical list of Atlantic hurricane names because of the storm's effects.

== Meteorological history ==
Map plotting the storm's track and intensity, according to the Saffir–Simpson scale Map key Saffir–Simpson scale Tropical depression (≤38 mph, ≤62 km/h) Tropical storm (39–73 mph, 63–118 km/h) Category 1 (74–95 mph, 119–153 km/h) Category 2 (96–110 mph, 154–177 km/h) Category 3 (111–129 mph, 178–208 km/h) Category 4 (130–156 mph, 209–251 km/h) Category 5 (≥157 mph, ≥252 km/h) Unknown Storm type Tropical cyclone Subtropical cyclone Extratropical cyclone, remnant low, tropical disturbance, or monsoon depression

The origins of Hurricane Elena trace to an easterly tropical wave that was first identified off the western coast of Africa on August 23, 1985. The system sped westward across the Atlantic at up to 35 mph (56 km/h). Its rapid motion, combined with the presence of an unusually hostile Saharan Air Layer, prevented tropical cyclogenesis for several days. Driven by a strong subtropical ridge to its north, the wave quickly approached North America as it began to show signs of organization. At 00:00 UTC on August 28, the disturbance developed into a tropical depression while over the Windward Passage. The newly designated depression began to track west-northwestward over Cuba, which is known to disrupt tropical cyclone development. Despite that, its central barometric pressure continued to deepen, and reconnaissance aircraft found winds exceeding 50 mph (80 km/h) near the center. In response, the National Hurricane Center upgraded the depression to Tropical Storm Elena over northern Cuba later on August 28.

After passing north of Havana, Cuba, Elena emerged into the Gulf of Mexico. At 12:00 UTC on August 29, Elena intensified into a Category 1 hurricane. Analysis of steering currents through the morning of August 30 suggested that Elena would continue on its northwestward track, striking the area between New Orleans, Louisiana, and Biloxi, Mississippi, within 30 hours. Unexpectedly, a mid-to-upper-level trough of low pressure diving in from the northwest created a weakness in the easterly currents, allowing Elena to recurve and slow drastically in forward speed. Roughly 24 hours after attaining hurricane intensity, the storm abruptly turned east in response to the trough. Having defied initial forecasts, Hurricane Elena drifted on its new course toward the coast of northwest Florida. Forecasters now called for the trough to direct the hurricane across the Florida Peninsula and into the western Atlantic. However, the relatively weak trough moved rapidly, and instead of fully engaging Elena, its axis passed over the storm's center. Further, post-storm analysis of water vapor imagery suggested that the hurricane split the trough into two distinct segments.

Hurricane Elena in the Gulf of Mexico on September 1 as seen from the STS-51-I Space Shuttle Discovery

Extrapolation from the storm's eastward progress yielded a projected landfall location near Levy County. However, after the passage of the upper-level system early on August 31, steering currents slackened, and Elena became nearly stationary in the extreme northeastern Gulf of Mexico. At its closest, the center of the storm was around 50 mi (80 km) from Cedar Key, Florida, with maximum sustained winds estimated at 105 mph (170 km/h). Elena's intensity remained consistent, and the cyclone was able to continue strengthening as soon as movement resumed. Early on September 1, Elena reached Category 3 major hurricane status. An area of high pressure soon began to build over the eastern United States, causing Elena to slowly retrograde westward. For much of September 1, the center of the hurricane was within range of the WSR-57 radar station in Apalachicola, Florida, enabling extensive study of small features within the eye and surrounding eyewall. During that period of observation, the previously unobstructed eye became cloud-filled.

The hurricane accelerated on a trajectory toward the central U.S. Gulf Coast, sliding south of the Florida Panhandle. During the afternoon of September 1, the hurricane attained its peak intensity, with winds of 125 mph (205 km/h) as confirmed by reconnaissance aircraft. On the morning of September 2, Elena approached coastal Mississippi from the east-southeast, still at major hurricane status. It came ashore close to Biloxi, which was coincidentally within the hurricane's first forecast destination range before its extended detour. Once inland, the hurricane immediately deteriorated, weakening to a tropical storm just hours after landfall, and its center rapidly filled. The system curved northwestward over Mississippi and Louisiana, and despite weakening, it continued to ignite thunderstorm activity which spawned heavy rains. Elena persisted for several days before degenerating into a remnant area of low pressure on September 4. Its associated cloud structure became distorted on September 5, and dissipated over Kentucky that same night.

== Preparations ==
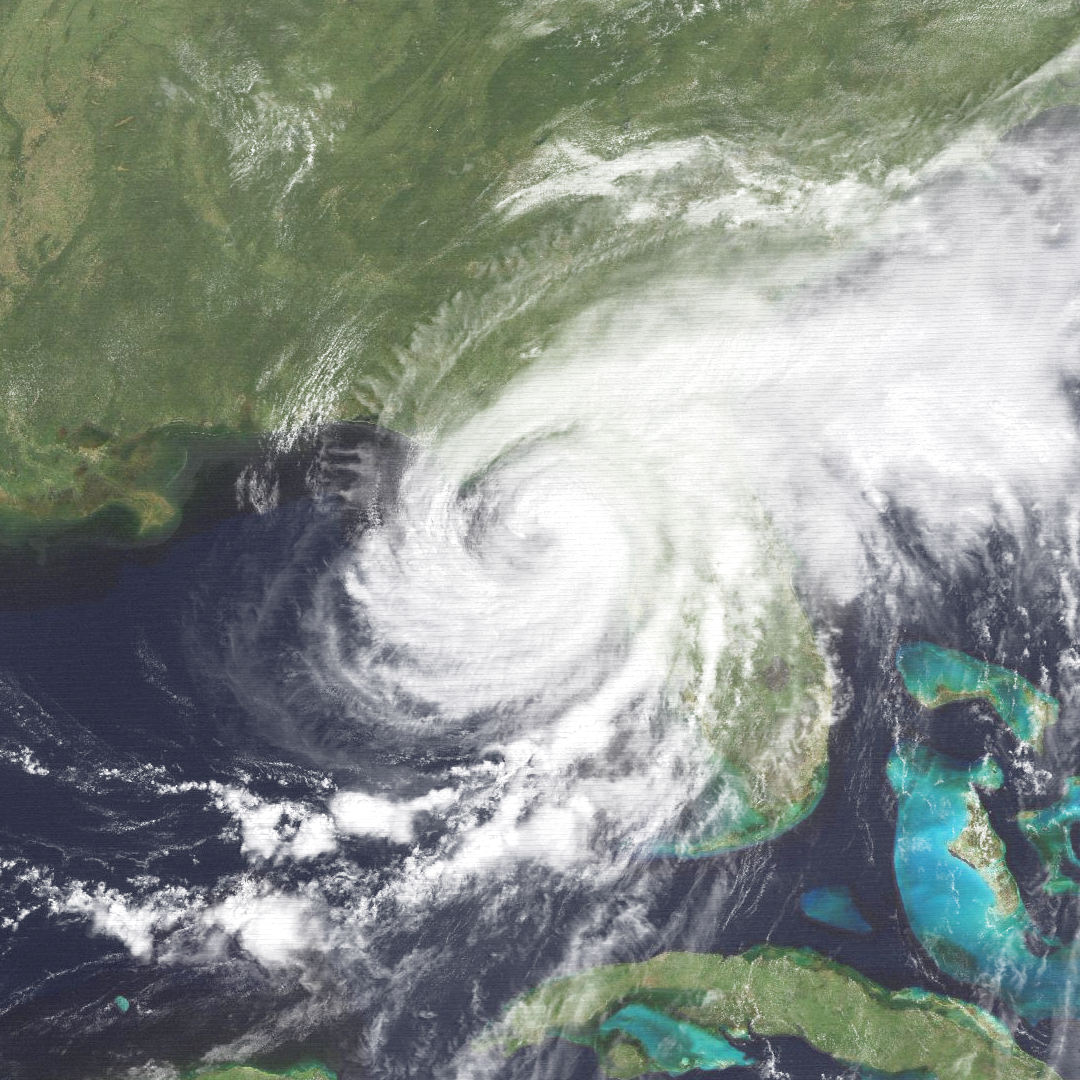
Hurricane Elena intensifying off the Florida coast on August 31

The unpredictable nature of the hurricane, in conjunction with its arrival at popular tourist destinations on the Labor Day holiday weekend, severely complicated preparations along the Gulf Coast. Evacuations and the hoisting of weather advisories inadvertently occurred in stages to keep up with Elena's shifts in direction; hurricane warnings were in effect at one point or another for every coastal location between Morgan City, Louisiana, and Sarasota, Florida. Much of the northern Gulf Coast was under a hurricane warning on two separate occasions for two different trajectories of the storm. Evacuations of residents and vacationers also overlapped in many cases. Collectively, this led to the "largest number of people ever evacuated", according to Robert Case. Some evacuees moved inland to meet relatives, but many stayed relatively local, filling hotels and designated shelters such as schools and churches. Despite the unusually fluid scenario, officials were well aware of the storm's destructive power days before its actual landfall. National Hurricane Center hurricane expert Bob Sheets cautioned on August 30 that Elena "will be over a $1 billion storm".

During Elena's initial approach, the first series of hurricane warnings were issued between Grand Isle, Louisiana, and Apalachicola, Florida. The storm's projected path quickly nudged westward, prompting the warnings to be extended to Morgan City, Louisiana, and truncated to Pensacola, Florida on their eastern reach. Heeding the advisories, nearly one million residents and vacationers fled the storm's path. Personnel on offshore oil rigs in the northern Gulf of Mexico began leaving as early as August 29. The governors of Louisiana, Mississippi, Alabama, and Florida declared states of emergency by August 30. Huge crowds formed at stores as individuals searched for emergency supplies, and simultaneously, lines grew at gas stations. Due to the impending danger, many businesses closed and fortified their buildings. Across the Gulf Coast, classes at schools were cancelled, and residents in the New Orleans area were particularly wary of what was being called the first serious hurricane threat in 20 years (Hurricane Betsy caused catastrophic flooding in and around New Orleans in 1965). In Mississippi, the mass exodus created bumper-to-bumper traffic on crucial highways, such as the west–east U.S. Route 90. In Florida, then-Governor Bob Graham activated 250 National Guard troops on August 30 to facilitate efficient evacuations, stating that 1,600 more were on standby. By that time, it became evident that Elena would head farther east than initially expected, stirring more concern for the eastern Gulf Coast. Accordingly, hurricane warnings were dropped for coastal Louisiana west of Grand Isle and replaced eastward to Apalachicola, Florida.

By the evening of August 30, after Elena's sharp turn to the east, hurricane warnings along most of the northern Gulf Coast were discontinued. In accordance, evacuees between Louisiana and the four westernmost counties of the Florida Panhandle returned home as shelters closed. With the storm's new course, the area of highest threat translated east to the remainder of the Panhandle and the western Florida Peninsula. As such, Governor Graham recommended evacuations south to the Tampa area late on August 30. A mandatory evacuation was then issued overnight for ten more coastal counties, encompassing 573,000 affected individuals. On August 31, Governor Graham advised residents in vulnerable areas of 15 inland counties to find safer ground. In response to the heightening danger, most of the National Guard troops previously on standby were sent to block access to certain areas, and an additional 3,000 were placed on standby.

In the greater St. Petersburg, Pinellas County, area alone, 320,000 people evacuated ahead of the storm in what was a national record for the largest evacuation of a single county in history. The large number of refugees from the storm put a strain on facilities, highways, and contingencies. Although the number of people required to leave far exceeded the capacity of Pinellas County shelters, only 120,000 of the 300,000 or more refugees made use of the shelters. Still, official shelter usage was considered to be higher than average, possibly due to shortened lead times limiting the ability of individuals to make arrangements with friends and relatives, or increased awareness of available resources. Post-storm phone surveys indicated that evacuation order compliance rates were as high as 90% in Pinellas County, and the entire evacuation there took just 9 hours, rather than the expected 15. With over 200,000 individuals recorded to be in more than 120 shelters along the coast of west-central Florida, evacuees became restless as a result of the duration of the storm. Supplies such as food ran short, and many people ignored orders and tried to return home prematurely. The threat of Hurricane Elena also triggered an unprecedented mass transfer of medical and nursing home patients. Tampa General Hospital, at 84% of patient capacity, was evacuated; four more hospitals and around 19 nursing homes in Pinellas County were also cleared. Overall, nearly 2,000 nursing home patients were transported to safety. Although successful, the process encountered issues such as time constraints and staffing shortages.

Late on September 1, when the storm began to retrograde, hurricane warnings were reinstated westward along the coast to Grand Isle, Louisiana, as advisories along the west coast of the Florida Peninsula were allowed to expire. By the time officials lifted evacuation orders, the number of evacuees staying in shelters already decreased significantly due to the rampant eagerness and anxiety. Roughly 250,000 people in the Florida Panhandle, 175,000 in Alabama, 70,000 in Mississippi, and 50,000 in Louisiana—a total of 545,000—were ordered to leave. Several hundred thousand of the people affected by the new string of evacuation orders had also been forced to leave just days earlier, and in extreme cases had one day or less reprieve. Governor Graham's office reported that during the entire storm event, 1.25 million people from Florida evacuated at some point, and state police in Louisiana estimated that figure in their state to be around 400,000. In total, nearly 2 million people fled the storm over its entire course.

== Impact ==
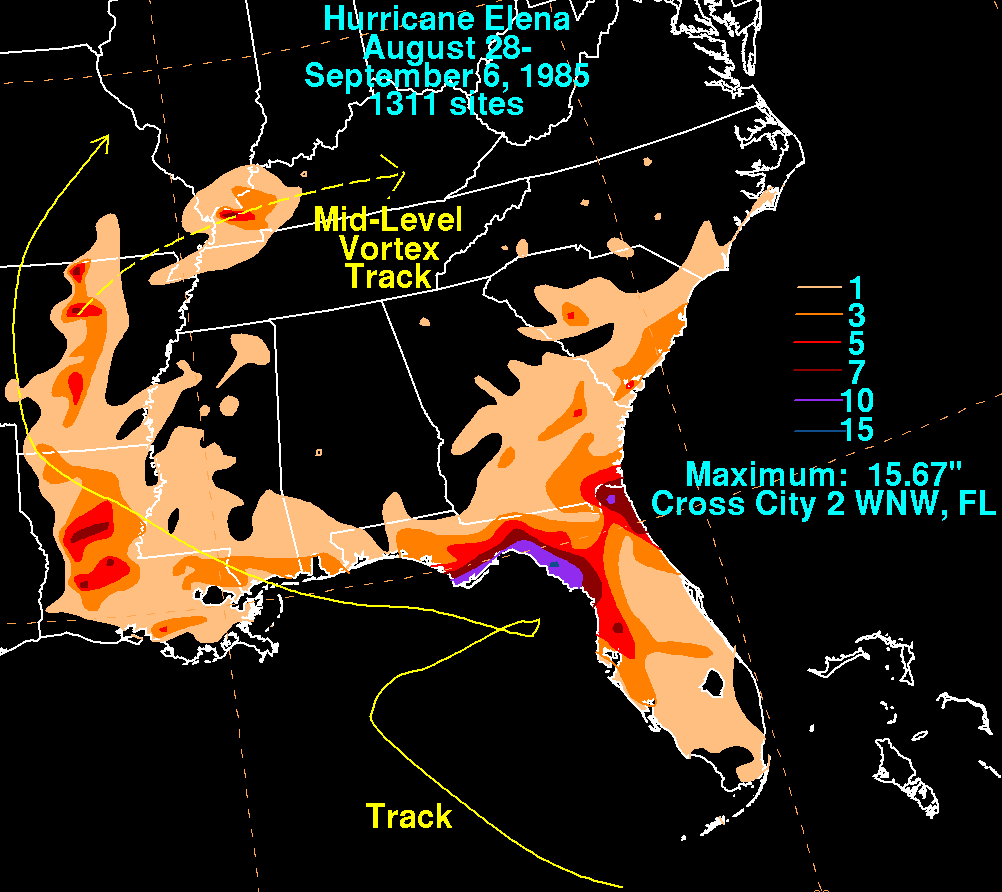
Elena's storm total rainfall in the United States

According to the Hurricane Research Division of the Atlantic Oceanographic and Meteorological Laboratory, Hurricane Elena produced Category 3 winds (111 mph (179 km/h) or greater) in Florida, Alabama, and Mississippi. The American Red Cross reported that in addition to the hundreds of single-family homes demolished by the hurricane, over 17,000 sustained some degree of damage; thousands of mobile homes, apartments, and condominiums were also damaged or destroyed. A forecaster at the National Hurricane Center determined the worst of the hurricane's effects were focused around Dauphin Island, Alabama, and Pascagoula, Mississippi, though noteworthy damage occurred across large areas of Louisiana, Mississippi, Alabama, and Florida, with effects documented as far west as South Padre Island, Texas, and as far north as Kentucky. Nine deaths were attributed to the hurricane in four states and on the waters of the Gulf of Mexico, and 134 people along Elena's path were hospitalized, many of them due to storm-related stress. Power outages plagued the entire region, affecting about 550,000 customers. The National Climatic Data Center compiled a total monetary damage figure of $1.3 billion.

In addition to its effects over land, Elena also affected offshore interests. When a cargo ship close to the hurricane's center rolled in high seas on August 29, two unsecured storage containers collided, crushing a man to death. An oil platform operated by Exxon and anchored off the coast of Pensacola, Florida, was ripped from its moorings and reported missing on September 2. The oil rig drifted 14 mi (23 km) away before it was spotted by a Coast Guard aircraft. Exxon previously evacuated the platform after rough seas snapped the first two of its eight anchoring cables. Damage was reported on four other offshore platforms, and a 6 in (150 mm) oil pipeline broke during the hurricane at an estimated cost of $1.6 million (the same pipeline broke two more times during the 1985 hurricane season).

A large aspect of the hurricane's devastation was the havoc it wrought on the eastern Gulf of Mexico oyster industry, particularly in the Apalachicola Bay area and off the coast of Alabama. Elena subjected the Apalachicola Bay reefs to high winds, strong tidal action, and moderate to heavy rainfall, churning up huge quantities of silt and mud which suffocated up to 90% of live oysters and virtually destroyed the most important harvesting sites. Commercial harvesting was suspended until May 1986, at which time some of the prominent reefs of the eastern Apalachicola Bay system were deemed able to sustain oyster-catching. Low astronomical tides amplified the effects of severe turbulence in the water. Thousands of individuals relying on the Apalachicola Bay oyster industry soon found themselves struggling to make a living; losses in production at two major reefs were expected to surpass $30 million. All of Alabama's major reefs were affected by the hurricane, and its most productive was nearly destroyed. The problem was later confounded in November by Hurricane Kate, which, according to the National Hurricane Center, "[dealt] the final blow" to certain oyster beds.

=== Florida ===
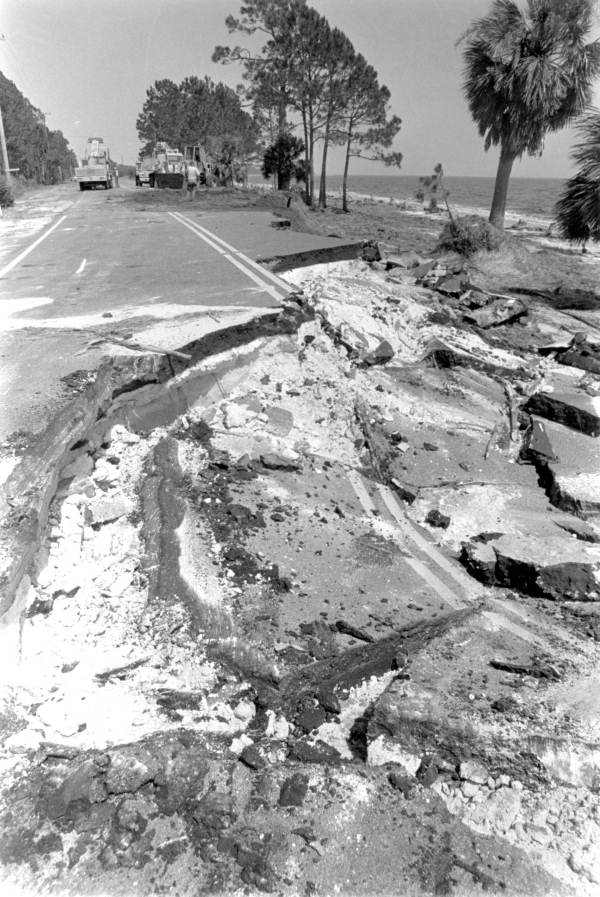
Numerous coastal roads, such as this one along the Gulf Coast of Florida, were damaged by the hurricane's storm surge.

The storm began affecting Florida late on August 28 and early on August 29. In Key West, on the east side of Elena's strengthening center, wind gusts exceeded 50 mph (80 km/h), accompanied by 1.8 in (46 mm) of rain and higher-than-normal tides. Several boats washed ashore at Smathers Beach. Similarly adverse conditions occurred throughout rest of the Keys and across the southern Florida Peninsula; 60 mph (100 km/h) wind gusts and modest rainfall stretched as far east as the Miami area. Easterly winds produced significant wave heights of 5.2 ft (1.6 m) at West Palm Beach and 10.5 ft (3.2 m) at Jacksonville, along the Atlantic coast of Florida, by August 31.

Outer rainbands of the large hurricane produced squally weather over parts of northern Florida as early as the morning of August 30. By then, the low-lying coastline near Apalachicola already began to flood. Elena would continue to affect the state for several days as it meandered offshore, resulting in moderate to heavy rainfall. Upwards of 10 in (250 mm) accumulated in many locations, peaking at 15.67 in (398 mm) near Cross City and reaching 11.31 in (287 mm) at Apalachicola. Farther south in the Tampa area, the precipitation was less significant, exceeding 5 in (130 mm) at Clearwater. Parts of the state's northeastern coast—farther away from the hurricane's center—also saw formidable rainfall, with a local maximum of 10.57 in (268 mm) at Jacksonville. Still, those totals represented a relatively dry storm, considering its long duration. Despite initial hopes that the hurricane would help alleviate drought conditions across interior portions of southern Florida, precipitation there was generally inconsequential.

Storm-heightened tides extended along the Florida coast as far south as Sarasota and generally ran a modest 3 to 6 ft (0.91 to 1.83 m) above normal, though their duration and extent proved noteworthy. The highest recorded storm surge associated with the hurricane was 10 ft (3.0 m) at Apalachicola. The combination of raised water levels and strong waves resulted in severe erosion along many beaches. Many homes near the water were destroyed by the surge, and shoreline structures such as docks, causeways, bridges, low-lying roads, and seawalls sustained substantial damage. Several large fishing piers were either partially or totally destroyed; notably, the city pier at Cedar Key and the popular 1,500 ft (460 m) Big Indian Rocks Fishing Pier were both demolished by the hurricane. Debris from the Big Indian Rocks Fishing Pier drifted northward toward Clearwater Pass and accumulated along private beaches at Belleair Shore.

The storm's strongest winds remained largely over open waters, although severe gusts still brushed coastal cities and barrier islands. The strongest winds were observed in two areas of the coast: from Cedar Key to Clearwater, and from Apalachicola to Pensacola. Official gust reports included 75 mph (121 km/h) at Cedar Key and nearly 70 mph (110 km/h) at Clearwater; later, on September 2, a gust of 90 mph (140 km/h) was observed at Pensacola along the Florida Panhandle, with sustained winds exceeding 50 mph (80 km/h). Winds in Franklin County approached 125 mph (201 km/h) by unofficial estimates. The storm's effects were not limited to the shore, however, as fallen trees in the inland Tallahassee area damaged around 50 vehicles.

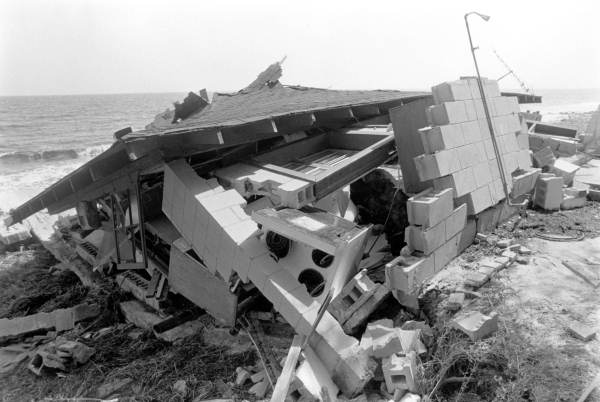
A beachfront structure destroyed by the hurricane in Florida

Although Hurricane Elena never crossed Florida's coast, its drawn-out interaction with land agitated large swaths of the state's western shore. Winds along and around the Pinellas County coast generally blew from the south or southwest for several days, creating persistent onshore flow that built up heavy seas. Near Clearwater, waves reached 8.2 ft (2.5 m) in height, marked by a period of 13 seconds on August 31. One study determined that the storm removed an average of 10 cubic yards of coastal material per linear foot of shoreline in Escambia County, Gulf, Franklin, and Pinellas counties, with values peaking at 15.6 cubic yards per foot. Along the predominantly marshy coasts of Pasco, Hernando, and Citrus counties, erosion and structural damage were much more limited, partly due to the local southerly or southeasterly wind direction.

In some cases, the hurricane left quasi-permanent alterations on beaches and small islands. For example, North Bunces Key—an island of southern Pinellas County—lost most of its vegetation to the storm, and overwashing shifted the southern part of the island up to 330 ft (100 m) from its original settlement. More extensive changes were seen on and near Caladesi Island, which formed in 1921 after a hurricane split a larger barrier island into two by a new channel. The inlet became dominant over Dunedin Pass to the south, which grew narrower very gradually until Elena rearranged the dynamics of the beach, allowing Dunedin Pass to fill completely with sand within a couple years of the hurricane's passage. As a result, Clearwater Beach became connected to Caladesi Island. Elena also created a new inlet known as Willy's Cut, which existed until 1991. Interest in artificially reopening Dunedin Pass prompted an official study in 1994 on the engineering and financial merits of such a project. Due to the high cost of dredging and the likelihood of nearly continuous maintenance, no action was taken.

The hurricane tore two barges from their moorings in Tampa Bay and blew them into Gandy Bridge, leaving the bridge with unspecified damage. Throughout the area, rising waters inundated streets, washed boats ashore, and destroyed numerous homes along the coast. At low-lying Cedar Key to the north, storm surge exceeded 9 ft (2.7 m). There, and at Alligator Point to the northwest, the surge values represented return periods of 25 to 30 years; elsewhere, they were equivalent to about 10-year events. Floodwaters in Cedar Key rose to 8 ft (2.4 m) in depth, with 2 ft (0.61 m) waves atop the standing water. The extent of structural damage was largely dependent on construction type, as newer, elevated buildings fared much better than older structures nearer sea level. Waterfront restaurants were especially susceptible; winds blew out several large sliding-glass doors at one establishment, allowing both the winds and the tide to enter its interior. Elena severed the sole bridge to Cedar Key, temporarily isolating the city and stranding several residents. The Florida Department of Transportation hurriedly worked to make the bridge passable long enough to rescue the stranded individuals. The hurricane compromised several other roads, destroying a 75 ft (23 m) section of State Road 24. Monetary losses in Cedar Key alone were estimated at $2 million, and all major aspects of local infrastructure were severely affected, initially preventing residents from returning home to the island. At least 34 homes and businesses on the island were damaged or destroyed.

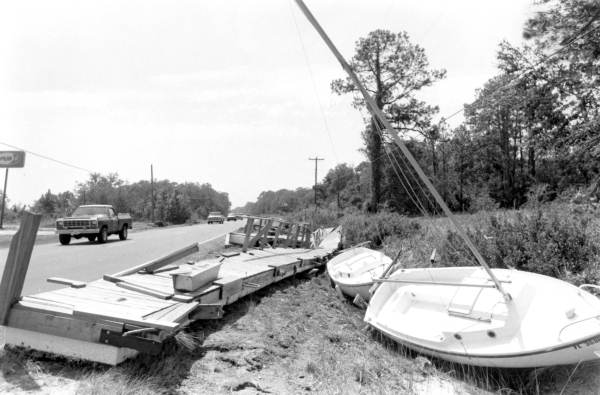
The storm washed maritime debris, such as small vessels and parts of docks, over land.

Pinellas County suffered some of the worst damage from Hurricane Elena in Florida. At the height of the storm, over 500,000 of its residents were without electricity. Forty-four single-family homes were destroyed, 31 more were damaged, and several condominiums, townhouses, and commercial buildings were damaged or destroyed. The hurricane also wrecked or irreparably compromised nearly 2.7 mi (4.3 km) of coastal bulkheads and inflicted minor damage on 2.15 mi (3.46 km) more. Most of the affected seawalls were degrading or poorly reinforced. Seawalls with higher standards of construction generally remained intact, though even in those cases, overwash from the Gulf of Mexico topped the barriers and deposited large volumes of sand. The hurricane cost roughly $100 million in Pinellas County.

Elena's track parallel to the Florida Panhandle subjected the coastline between Apalachicola and Pensacola Beach to particularly severe conditions that resulted in "significant" property damage there. In Apalachicola proper, winds tore large roofs off buildings, and data from Florida's Department of Natural Resources indicate that 20 residences and one community building in Franklin County were damaged or destroyed. Structural failure was prevalent along the county's waterfront and on islands such as Dog Island; however, it was mainly limited to poorly constructed buildings. Several miles of roadways in the county sustained significant damage, and about 1/2 mile (800 m) of bulkhead was destroyed. Low seawalls allowed crucial points of the causeway to St. George Island to erode, causing it to fail. In Escambia County, the hurricane left $2 million in damages. Throughout much of the remainder of the Florida Panhandle, structural damage was limited, though 100,000 people in the Pensacola area lost power. The configuration of the southern tip of Cape San Blas in Gulf County was changed by the storm. The hurricane wiped out eagle nests, generated freshwater fish kills, and affected other species of wildlife at the St. Vincent and St. Marks National Wildlife Refuges. St. George Island and Honeymoon Island State Parks were heavily affected, with appreciable but lesser damage in numerous other protected areas. U.S. Route 98, which closely follows the coast in this region, required extensive repairs after being undermined in nearly two dozen locations.

When tropical cyclones move over land, they often produce the wind shear and atmospheric instability required for the development of weak, embedded supercell thunderstorms, which can produce tornadoes. These tornadoes are usually weak and short-lived, but still capable of producing significant damage. While centered over the Gulf of Mexico, the eastern side of Hurricane Elena's circulation spawned several such tornadoes over central Florida. A tornado struck just east of Leesburg on September 1, destroying 64 single-family houses and mobile homes, and damaging another 118; seven people were treated for non-life-threatening injuries. Later that same day, another tornado touched down over downtown Leesburg, with much less damage. In nearby Marion County, tornadic activity destroyed six mobile homes, compromised another 50 residences, and inflicted as much as $500,000 in total losses, though only minor injuries were reported. At Kennedy Space Center Launch Complex 39 in Cape Canaveral, a weak tornado struck two vehicles near the location where Space Shuttle Atlantis was being prepared for its first flight. A tornado in New Port Richey tore parts of the roof off at least one building and brought down trees, and tornadic activity was also identified in Sumter County.

The hurricane took one life in the state and indirectly contributed to two additional deaths. In Daytona Beach, a tree struck a parked vehicle, killing a person inside. The exact cause of the tree's uprooting was unknown, although it may have been hit by lightning or a short-lived tornado. Elsewhere, two individuals died of heart attacks: one while installing storm shutters on his home, and another at a designated shelter.

=== Alabama ===
The center of Elena passed 30 mi (50 km) south of mainland Alabama as it accelerated toward the Gulf Coast, affecting the state's two-county coast and offshore islands. Wind gusts at Dauphin Island, situated much closer to the hurricane's eye, were estimated to have reached 130 mph (210 km/h); these velocities represented some of the highest experienced on land from the storm, and were strong enough to snap hundreds of large pine trees. Dauphin Island received an 8.4 ft (2.6 m) storm surge that resulted in substantial flooding and areas of total overwash. Rainfall amounted to just 3 in (76 mm) on the island.

With its location close to the storm's center, Dauphin Island saw the greatest damage in Alabama. Access to the island was shut down during and immediately after the hurricane, slowing the progression of damage assessments. Additionally, the storm cut power and phone services. Post-storm surveys revealed discernible patterns in structural damage on the island; these included a nearly complete lack of destruction on the heavily wooded eastern end, and damage concentrated closer to the western side and along areas exposed to strong easterly winds. First-hand accounts relayed that in the most severe cases, entire elevated homes were torn from their pilings and swept into the Gulf of Mexico. The number of homes demolished in that manner was informally placed at 50, though such total building collapses were typically confined to poorly secured buildings. In total, the hurricane destroyed 190 residences on Dauphin Island, accounting for nearly 25% of all homes, and a further 235 sustained substantial damage. An unofficial and early estimate of losses on the island was $30 million.

Windspeeds were markedly lower over mainland Alabama; Mobile recorded winds of over 50 mph (80 km/h), with gusts as high as 84 mph (135 km/h). The storm's angle of approach created strong offshore winds along the mainland, which depressed water levels and limited the extent of positive surge once winds shifted to onshore. Winds from the hurricane took a toll on crops, ruining 8,000,000 lb (3,600,000 kg) of pecans and reducing soybean production by 10%. Farms were still in the process of recovering from Hurricane Frederic in 1979 when Elena struck.

Wave action took a toll on the foundations of waterfront structures along the coasts of Baldwin and Mobile counties, where Elena inflicted about $715,000 worth of damage to roadways. Most damage was concentrated near the shore, where extensive erosion took place, and on islands and minor peninsulas. Farther inland, Elena's impact was generally limited to downed trees and power lines. The storm destroyed the city boardwalk at Gulf Shores, with the cost of rebuilding expected to approach $300,000. Alabama Power reported extensive power outages affecting up to 100,000 customers. According to the Insurance Information Institute, storm-related damages in Alabama totaled about $100 million. An estimated 300 homes in the state were destroyed by Hurricane Elena, and another 1,345 sustained lighter damage.

=== Mississippi ===
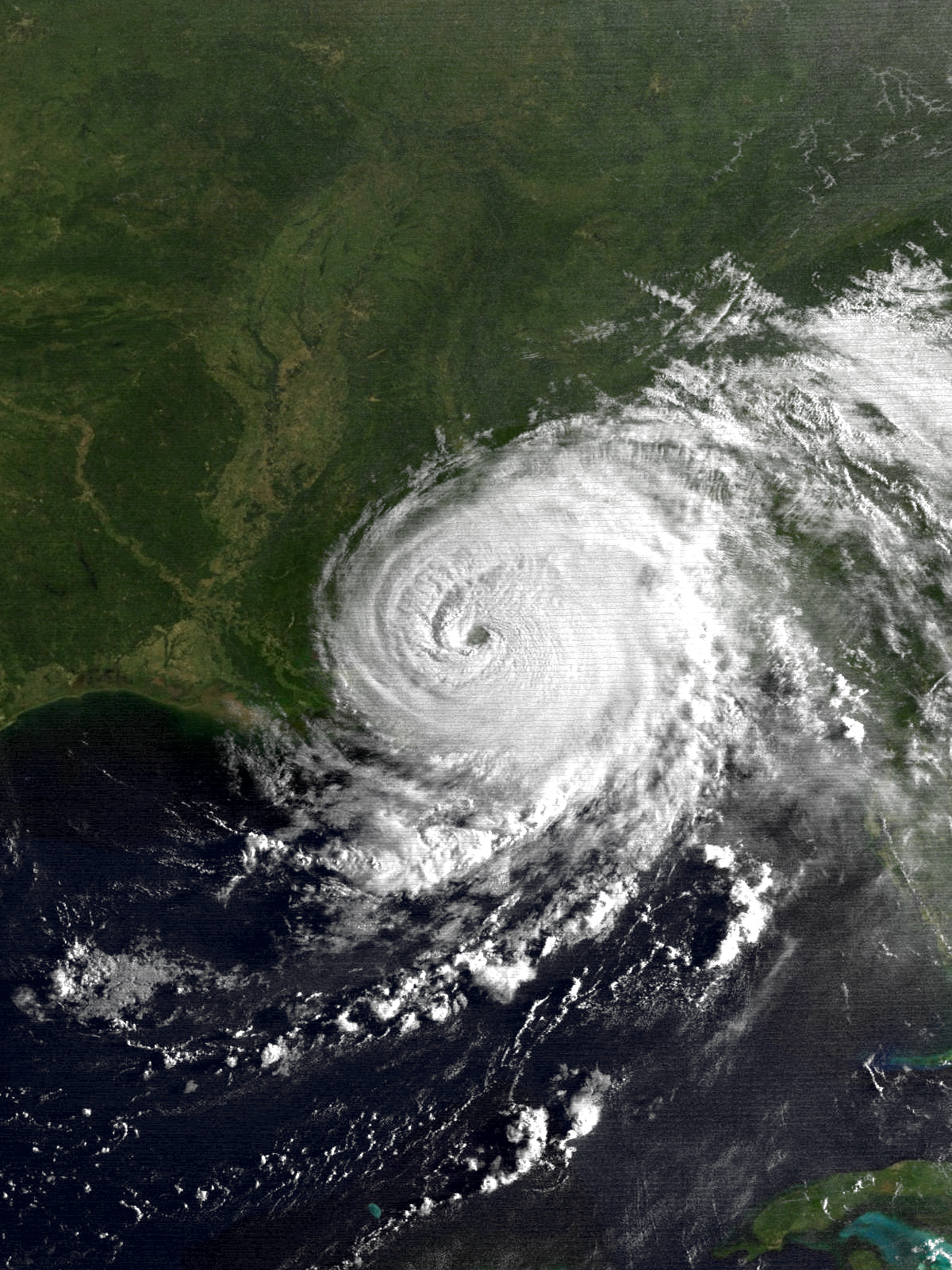
Elena shortly before making landfall in Mississippi on September 2

Along the coast of Mississippi, where Elena made landfall, the most significant effects of the storm stemmed from its strong winds gusting to over 120 mph (190 km/h). Recorded gusts included 121 mph (195 km/h) at Gulfport, 115 mph (185 km/h) at Pascagoula, and 90 mph (140 km/h) at Biloxi. Several other weather stations clocked sustained winds at over 90 mph (140 km/h). Consistent with the storm's dry nature, rainfall in the state was mainly light and confined to southern and western areas. Gulfport picked up more than 4.5 in (110 mm), while just over 3 in (75 mm) of rain fell at Natchez. Some streets in Gulfport and Biloxi flooded at the height of the storm. The highest tides ran 6 to 8 ft (1.8 to 2.4 m) above normal along the coast, reaching 7.9 ft (2.4 m) above average at Pascagoula and Ocean Springs. As in Alabama, negative surge values were recorded at the storm's onset. The tide gauge at Gulfport recorded a water level of 5.6 ft (1.7 m) below average early on September 2, before quickly swelling to 5.43 ft (1.66 m) above normal. Air pressure reportedly fell so rapidly at Pascagoula that car windows began to shatter. The barometer there bottomed out at 953 mb, the lowest pressure recorded on land in association with the cyclone.

The worst of the damage occurred along a 40 mi (64 km) stretch of coastline, centered on the Pascagoula area. Elena's winds damaged most of the schools in Jackson County, and more specifically, every school in Pascagoula was structurally compromised to some degree. Damages to schools in Ocean Springs totaled $3 million. In the same city, the overall conditions following the hurricane were described as worse than those in the prior hurricanes Frederic or Camille. Elena destroyed 20 houses and two supermarkets in Ocean Springs, and several buildings on every city block sustained severe roof damage due to fallen trees. Two shopping centers were destroyed in nearby Gautier, possibly by short-lived tornadoes. A fire captain in Gautier remarked immediately after the storm that he had not yet seen an unharmed building in the city. The community became essentially isolated from the outside world, and quickly began to run short of food, clean water, and gasoline supplies. Initial reports from Pascagoula also indicated that most, or all, of that city's buildings were damaged. Nearly every business in the city was damaged to the extent that none were able to open when the storm cleared. A post-storm assessment by the Mississippi Emergency Management Agency revealed over 900 businesses in Jackson County sustained damage, contributing to a total of nearly 1,500 in the state's three coastal counties.

Harrison and Hancock counties were generally not affected quite as severely as communities closer to the Alabama border, but the entire area still suffered extensively. In sections of Gulfport, large fires were sparked by downed power lines and fed by broken natural gas pipes. Debris on roadways prevented firefighters from reaching the fires, allowing them to spread. Similar destruction was seen to the east at Biloxi, where the hurricane's winds tore the roofs off many buildings. Beachfront communities were in a state of disarray, with large trees uprooted, debris littering the ground, and accumulations of sand on parts of roads like U.S. 90. Damage to schools in Harrison County—particularly in Gulfport and Biloxi—was extensive. Most homes in the area survived the storm, which was locally estimated to have been a once-in-50-year event, with relatively little damage. Several buildings along the coast in the Biloxi area sustained severe damage, but many of the older houses near the Gulf of Mexico there fared remarkably well. Winds brought down large highway signs, in some cases striking nearby buildings. Along the coast, Elena caused beach erosion, damaged coastal structures and recreational beach facilities, and dislocated navigational buoys and markers in various ports, several of which were closed pending Coast Guard inspection. Winds over inland Pearl River County damaged 350 permanent and mobile homes, and as in Alabama, the hurricane took a large toll on pecan and soybean crops and farms.

There were numerous reports in southern Mississippi of embedded tornadoes that exacerbated the hurricane's effects. Reports in Gulfport indicated that three schools actively being used as hurricane shelters were struck and damaged by tornadoes. At one location, almost 400 people being housed in a school had to rush to safety before part of its roof collapsed. Another apparent tornado sideswiped a senior citizens' center, endangering nearly 200 people in a structure that sustained damage to windows, doors, and part of its roof; about 20 people required rescue by paramedics. Only minor injuries occurred in association with the possible tornadoes. Teams of experts tasked with reviewing the validity of tornado reports were largely unable to prove that a significant portion of the damage in southern Mississippi had been done by tornadoes. As a result, few tornadoes were confirmed, and it is likely that most of the damage in the region resulted from squall-like winds that are part of an intense hurricane's nature, or potentially localized microbursts. Any unconfirmed tornadoes would have been no stronger than the hurricane's synoptic winds.

The storm left 80,000 Mississippi Power Company customers without electricity; most of Jackson County's 126,000 residents were affected by the outage. Operations at Ingalls Shipbuilding in Pascagoula were halted due to the power outage and widespread damage to the shipyard's buildings and cranes, and at least two other shipyards in the state were affected by the hurricane. Additionally, the storm forced the temporary closure of the Chevron USA refinery at Pascagoula. Facilities at Horn Island in the Gulf Islands National Seashore, Buccaneer State Park, and the Mississippi Sandhill Crane National Wildlife Refuge required repairs following the storm; at the latter, damages included the cost of healing a Florida sandhill crane's injured leg. Thirty seafood processing plants were damaged, and one was destroyed. The Red Cross estimated that 200 single-family houses in the state were destroyed, and some 13,200 were damaged, 1,200 of them heavily. Additionally, the hurricane demolished 390 mobile homes and damaged another 2,290. The overall cost of damage in Mississippi alone approached $1 billion.

=== Louisiana ===
After moving inland, the storm's northwestward track brought it over the Louisiana border on two separate occasions, first reaching Washington Parish as a minimal hurricane. Winds there were strong enough to bring down hundreds of trees, damaging houses and knocking out power to over 15,000 customers in the process. The hurricane also overturned mobile homes and strew debris throughout communities such as Bogalusa and Franklinton in Washington Parish, the hardest-hit area in the state. Downed trees caused damage to 200 homes and another 200 businesses, chiefly near Bogalusa.

Winds across the rest of the state were moderate, gusting to around 50 mph (80 km/h) at Slidell on the northeastern shore of Lake Pontchartrain, so damage outside of Washington Parish was sporadic. Throughout the state, at least 40,000 electric customers lost power. Located southwest of the storm's core, New Orleans escaped with little damage and relatively benign weather conditions; still, the hurricane triggered minor flooding and brought down tree limbs around the city. Levees along the shores of Lake Pontchartrain were able to contain the lake's large waves, despite initial fears to the contrary. Still, the adverse conditions forced the temporary closure of the Lake Pontchartrain Causeway. The storm led to the deaths of two individuals in the state: one due to a drowning in St. Tammany Parish and another in a traffic accident attributed to the weather. Insured and uninsured damages were worth near $17 million combined, with an additional $500,000 in agricultural losses.

Elena subjected the Chandeleur Islands to a 6.5 ft (2.0 m) or greater storm surge. The island chain is an important buffer to parts of mainland Louisiana against storms, but is frequently reshaped or shrunken by intense hurricanes. Hurricane Danny and Hurricane Juan also affected the islands in 1985. Elena eroded away at least 20% and possibly up to 40% of the Chandeleur Islands' total land mass and cut 30 significant channels into the island chain. Parts of the islands left intact suffered extensive loss of vegetation. The hurricane, along with Danny and Juan, also affected several other barrier islands, and Elena itself removed as much as 112 ft (34 m) of beach along the island of Grand Isle, Louisiana.

=== Elsewhere ===
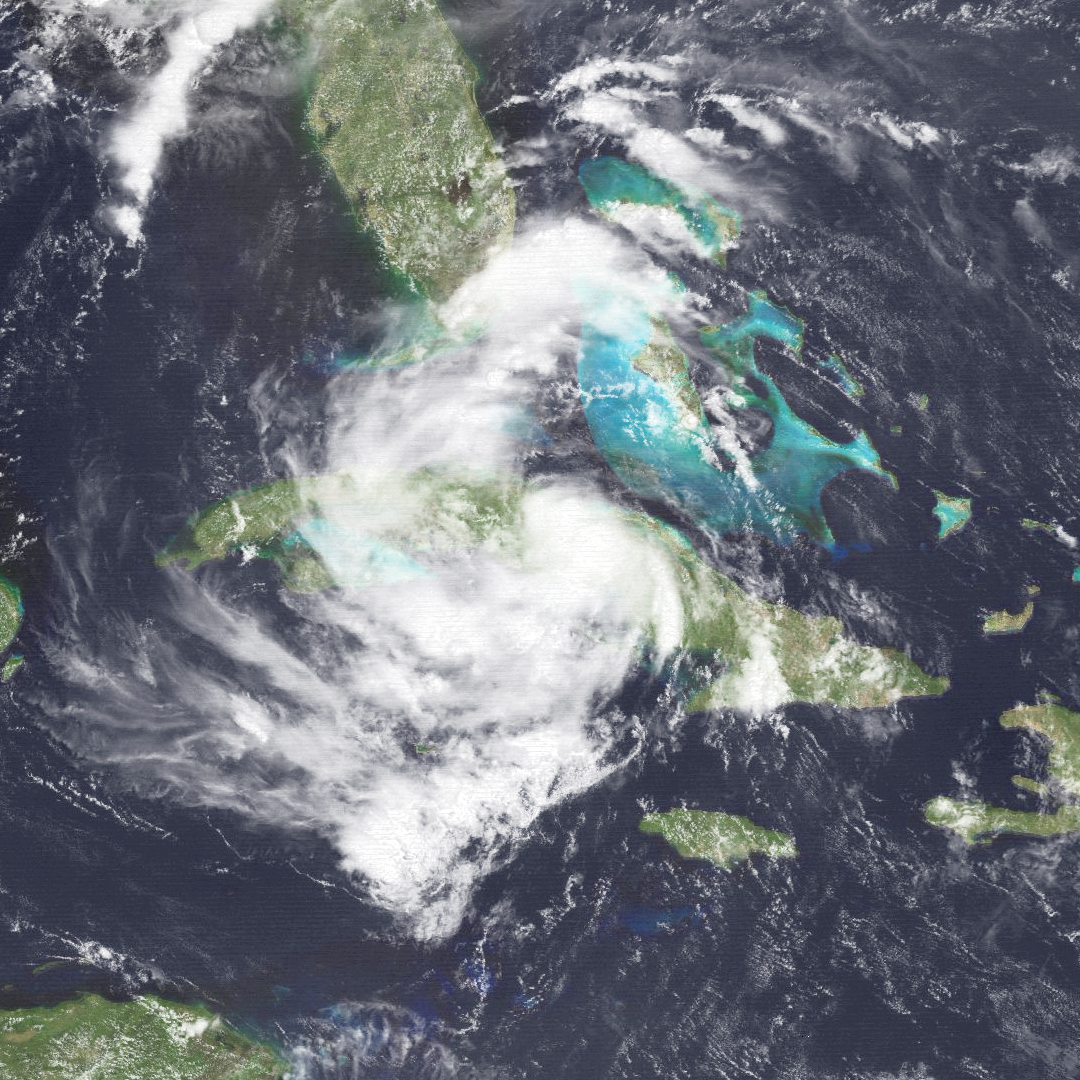
Tropical Storm Elena over Cuba on August 28

Precipitation from Hurricane Elena reached into southern Georgia and parts of South Carolina, with little impact aside from meager drought relief. For several days after landfall, the weakening tropical cyclone produced moderate to heavy rainfall across portions of central and northern Arkansas. Rainfall totals were generally 2 to 4 in (51 to 102 mm), with locally higher amounts; Mountain Home, Arkansas received 8.95 in (227 mm) of rain, including 6.6 in (170 mm) in just three hours on September 4. Clinton to the south recorded 8.6 in (220 mm). At the state capital of Little Rock, under 3 in (76 mm) of liquid fell. Listed by the National Weather Service among "some of the most significant tropical cyclones to affect Arkansas", the remnants of Elena triggered flash flooding in parts of four counties; 2 ft (0.61 m) of standing water submerged streets in downtown Hot Springs. In Mountain Home, floodwaters forced 10 families to evacuate their homes, and one person died after a swollen creek swept her car off a bridge spanning it.

Significant rainfall also occurred over parts of western Kentucky, with lighter precipitation in several adjacent states. Over 8 in (200 mm) fell at Paducah, where urban streets and low-lying terrain experienced freshwater flooding Floodwaters 4 ft (1.2 m) deep submerged cars to their windows and infiltrated 40 homes, several businesses, a hotel, and a high school. Localized evacuations and road closures were required, and a person wading in an active creek had to be rescued after the creek swept him downstream. Around 10,000 customers lost electric service for a short period due to the storm. Shelters were opened to those displaced by the flooding, but scarcely used.

Early in its formative stages, Elena triggered rainshowers and thunderstorms over parts of Cuba, The Bahamas, and Hispaniola. Later, the mature hurricane generated strong rip currents as far away as South Padre Island, Texas, where two swimmers drowned in separate incidents over the Labor Day weekend. Both victims were male Texas residents.

== Aftermath ==
Hurricane Elena is remembered not only for its severe impacts, but also for its unpredictability and the wide extent to which pre-storm preparations occurred.

=== Florida ===
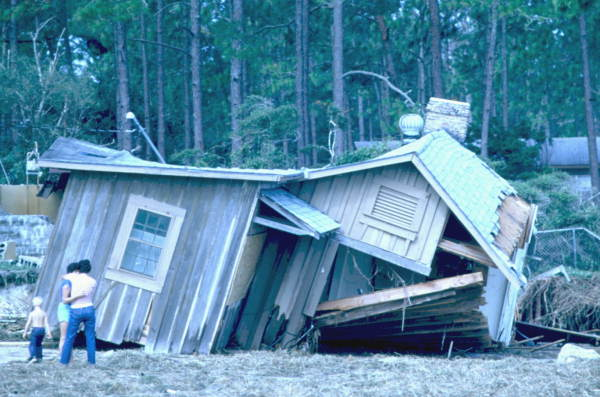
House destroyed by Hurricane Elena in Florida

The state of Florida received a federal Major Disaster Declaration on September 12. Franklin, Levy, Manatee, and Pinellas counties—where the storm left 5,000 individuals without work—became eligible for federal aid after President Ronald Reagan visited the state and determined that residents in those areas would benefit from assistance such as temporary housing, low-interest loans for rebuilding efforts, and monetary grants. Disaster centers were opened in those four counties as centralized locations for federal, state, and volunteer agencies to operate relief programs. President Reagan later included Hillsborough, Wakulla, and Dixie counties, bringing the total number of Florida counties eligible for federal aid to seven. The deadline for residents of all seven counties to apply for either state or federal assistance was set for November 12. Several major corporations—including Texaco, Exxon, and J.C. Penney—contacted customers in the affected areas and offered to make special arrangements for their monthly payments if they had been financially affected by the storm. While only a small number of customers took advantage of the assistance, the companies' actions were met with highly positive feedback.

In the days following the storm, residents of Cedar Key were forbidden from returning to their homes and businesses while washed-out roadways underwent repairs and debris was cleared. Portable toilets were delivered and clean water trucked in for use while the city's infrastructure was being stabilized. After the city of Cedar Key dropped its participation in the National Flood Insurance Program in early 1984, leaving residents unable to purchase flood insurance for their property, the city council voted unanimously to return to the program after Hurricane Elena. Tourism decreased significantly in some areas due to prospective travelers' concerns about the extent of the damage. The hurricane created a 13% drop in visitors between October 1984 and October 1985 in Pinellas County, marking an early end to the annual "tourist season", which generally ends after Labor Day weekend; tourist spending fell accordingly.

After the storm, residents were allowed to return to their neighborhoods on a by-town basis. Once authorized to enter their communities, many individuals inadvertently gained access to other municipalities in the area that were not ready for the return of civilians. In turn, dangerous situations arose amid preliminary cleanup operations. In Pinellas County, laws were proposed to unify the municipal decisions to accept residents after future disasters. As part of the proposed laws, the county sheriff, as opposed to local officials, would become responsible for allowing cities to reopen. Despite extensive resistance, county commissioners approved the change, giving the sitting sheriff power to override municipal evacuation orders. An additional ordinance was proposed to allow banning of alcohol sales during emergencies. During Hurricane Elena, intoxicated individuals created disorder at shelters and impeded evacuations by refusing to leave hurricane parties.

To help the Apalachicola Bay shellfish industry recover, special regulations were put in place to monitor harvests, and $2 million was designated toward rehabilitation efforts. Using a portion of the funds, out-of-work oyster catchers were employed to repopulate crucial reefs. The state of Florida also issued a grant to help individuals in the crippled seafood industry make necessary payments. Efforts to help newly unemployed individuals in the shellfish industry continued in the months following the storm; local Tallahassee musicians organized a benefit concert in January 1986 to raise money for families of oystermen in Franklin County.

On September 1 and 2, Florida Power Company received help from Gulf Coast companies to return power to 170,000 customers before the assisting companies' home areas were struck by the hurricane. Power was restored to most areas by September 4, with an exception being St. George's Island; service was expected to be restored after several additional days. More broadly, owners of heavily damaged homes in the state faced new regulations on coastal construction in the state, which went into effect less than a month after the storm. The new rules entailed more rigorous study of factors such as a property's prior history and surrounding buildings before approval to rebuild a demolished structure would be granted. Governor Graham preliminarily advised that houses more than halfway destroyed not be rebuilt. Recovery efforts after Hurricane Elena continued to a small degree for years after its passage; for example, beach replenishment at Indian Rocks Beach in Pinellas County began in the summer of 1990.

=== Central Gulf Coast ===
Power companies from several states sent workers to help restore service to the hardest-hit areas of the Gulf Coast. Most of Alabama Power's affected customers had power within 24 hours of the storm, though restoration of service to Dauphin Island took significantly longer. Power was fully restored to Central Louisiana Electric customers by September 4. Alabama's two coastal counties were declared federal disaster areas on September 7. Special loan assistance was made available by the Small Business Administration and the Farmers Home Administration, the latter of which sought to help commercial growers who lost their crops to the storm.

Mississippi Governor William Allain sent 500 members of the National Guard to partner with 200 law enforcement officers along Mississippi's coast in minimizing crime, and nighttime curfews were established in several cities. On September 4, President Reagan declared Mississippi's coastal counties a Major Disaster area. The Federal Emergency Management Agency estimated that as many as 3,000 homes in the state were uninhabitable, their occupants forced to find temporary living arrangements. The Small Business Administration approved special loans up to $500,000 for owners of damaged businesses. Mississippi Power Company's system was the hardest-hit, and restoration of service was slow; 50,000 of 80,000 customers were still without electricity by September 5.

By September 5, the Salvation Army, Red Cross, and other organizations had served 100,000 meals to those displaced by the hurricane in Mississippi, and federal food stocks became available for the state to distribute to storm victims. Still, resources such as food and ice started to run short in the hardest-hit locations, and long lines formed at the first few stores and gas stations to reopen. With dwindling supplies, the Salvation Army had to procure food from other parts of the region to serve to victims. In the days after the hurricane, an increase in heart attack deaths in the Harrison County area was noted.

=== Retirement ===
On account of the widespread damage left behind by the hurricane, the World Meteorological Organization retired the name Elena from the rotating Atlantic tropical cyclone naming lists in the spring of 1986, and it will never again be used in the basin. It was replaced with Erika for the 1991 season.

== See also ==
- List of Category 3 Atlantic hurricanes
- List of United States hurricanes
- List of Florida hurricanes (1975–1999)
- List of retired Atlantic hurricane names
- List of tropical cyclone-spawned tornadoes
- Hurricane Sally (2020) – A category 2 hurricane that also stalled in the Gulf of Mexico
