= 1822 Martinique–Venezuela hurricane =

Off-season Atlantic hurricane

1822 West Indies hurricane
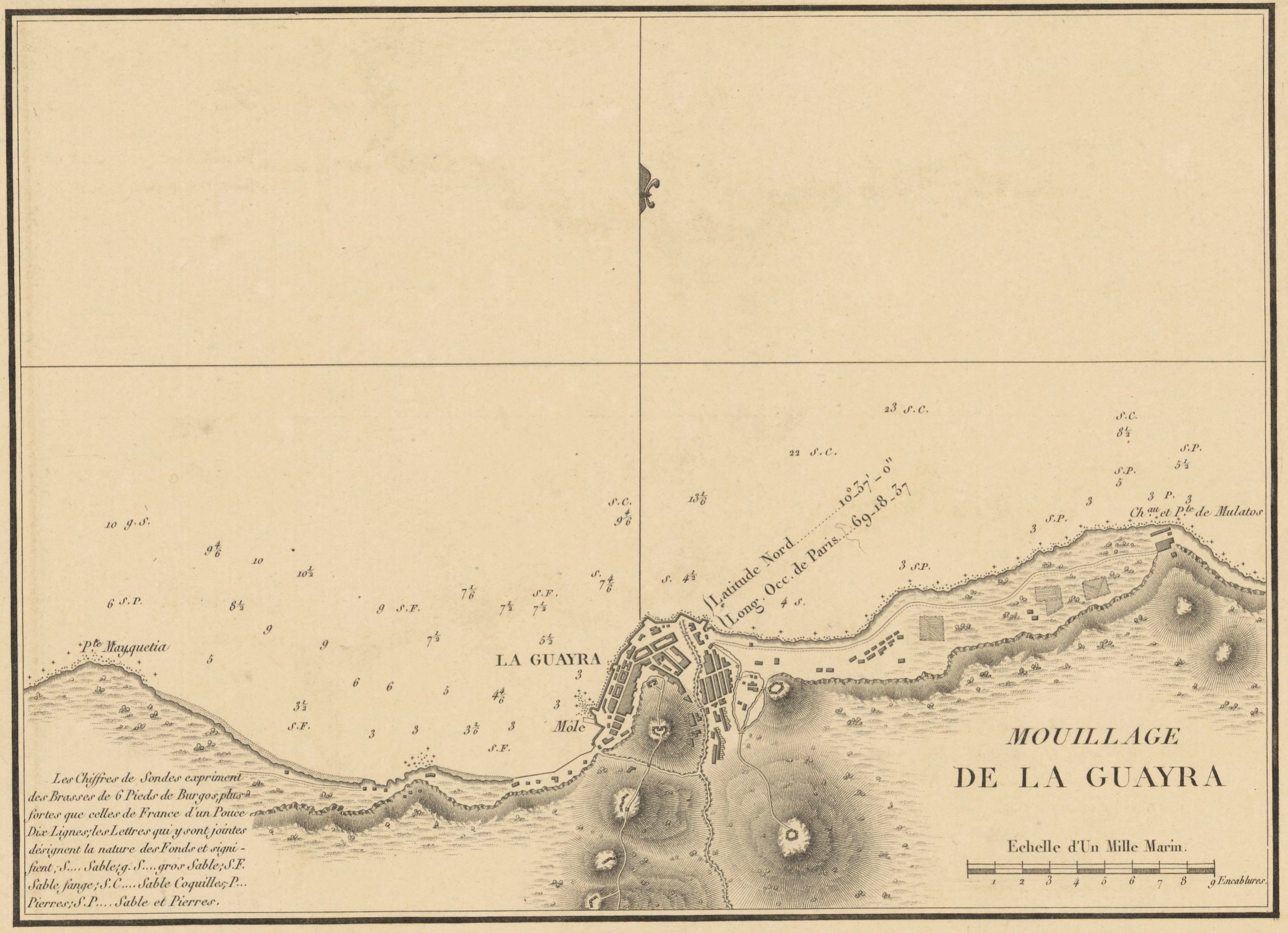
- A 1831 hand drawn map of La Guaira, Venezuela roughly 9 years after the storm.

Meteorological history
- Formed: Unknown
- Dissipated: December 22, 1822

Category 1 hurricane
- 1-minute sustained (SSHWS/NWS)
- Highest winds: ≥75 mph (≥120 km/h)

Overall effects
- Fatalities: ~105
- Injuries: Several
- Damage: Unknown
- Areas affected: Lesser Antilles (especially Martinique), Gran Colombia
- Part of the 1822 Atlantic hurricane season

The 1822 Martinique–Venezuela hurricane was an unprecedented and deadly Atlantic hurricane that struck the Lesser Antilles and Venezuela in December. It's the 2nd deadliest hurricane to affect South America, and one of the deadliest to occur during the off-season. It also holds the record for the latest landfall of a tropical cyclone in the Western Hemisphere, along with many other meteorological records for the month of December. (Note: The official database called "HURDAT" begins in 1851. Since the arrival of European settlement in the 15th century, no verifiable records of a later landfall exist.)

The storm likely originated from an extratropical low in the open Atlantic sometime during mid-December. It then passed Lesser Antilles as a hurricane before striking modern day Venezuela soon thereafter. While two other hurricanes – one in 1541 and another in 1954 – formed later in their respective seasons, their landfalls occurred in January of the following year.

Unofficially, it's the latest tropical cyclone of hurricane intensity to make a landfall within the Western Hemisphere by nearly a month. It also had one of the southernmost landfalls for a hurricane, second to at least the 1933 Trinidad hurricane. (Note: Winds greater than 73 mph (117 km/h), which corresponds to Category 1 or higher on the Saffir-Simpson Scale, is considered to be of "hurricane intensity.") Only 5 other hurricanes (1847, 1877, 1892, 1933, and 2004) have struck South America since the beginning of the 19th century.

== Meteorological history ==
The hurricane of unknown origins was first documented nearing the Lesser Antilles on December 13th after winds began increasing on several islands. They held steady for a few days until a "heavy gale" was experienced in Basse-terre on the 16th. On the 17th and 18th, the storm passed north of Barbados where winds peaked from the west. Intense winds extended up to St. Thomas and Anguilla, and were considerably strong as far as St. Croix. This suggest the storm was unusually large; potentially one of the largest within the Caribbean Sea.

During the 16th, winds from the west shifted west-northwest in Martinique. By the next day, it augmented progressively until the 19th where it peaked around sunset. The cyclone then passed near or over St. Pierre that same day. While no barometric pressure readings from the islands are known, the winds were reportedly almost as violent as an intense hurricane in 1813 that killed thousands in Dominica and Martinique.

After passing through Martinique, the storm continued in an unusual southern trajectory. It passed west of St. Lucia on the 20th where it "blew a complete hurricane". In St. Vincent that same day, the winds shifted and blew greatly from the southwest. Grenada also reported an intense northwest wind that that later shifted and blew greatly from the southwest.

Shortly after impacting the Windward Islands, the hurricane traveled southwestward with an increasing forward speed. It continued in that general direction until it made landfall slightly west of La Guaira, Venezuela. It was last noted over Venezuela on the 22nd. (Note: Time and date shown is local, unless stated otherwise (e.g. track image).)

== Impact ==
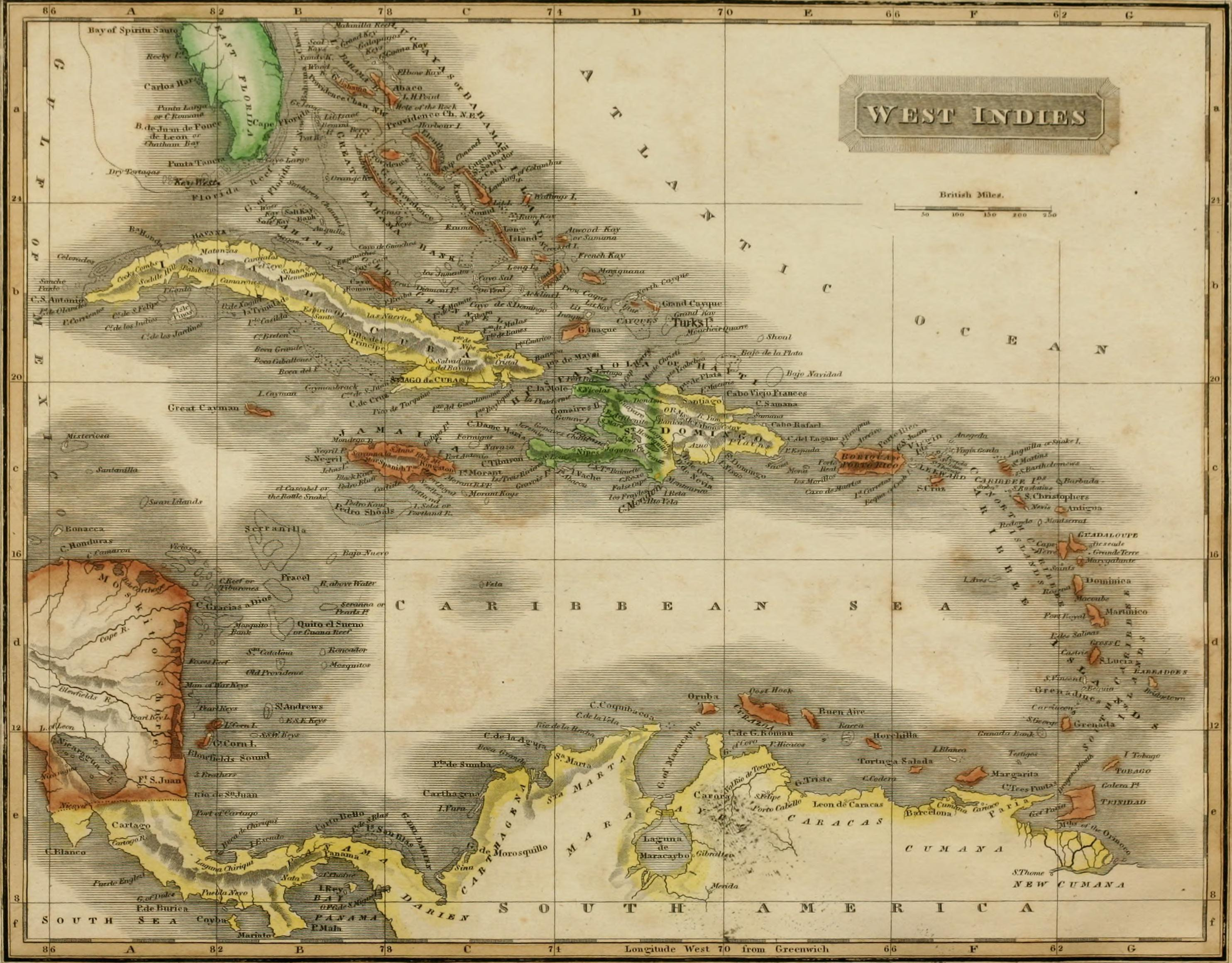
A 1820s map of the Caribbean.

The weather from the 16th to the 20th had a most alarming appearance, being attended with all the indications of a hurricane, except the season of the year.

— Grenada - January 11th

=== Lesser Antilles ===
After passing through the Lesser Antilles, documentation of the damage began. St. Thomas and St. Croix suffered serious shipping damage. Dominica saw considerable impacts to the country where buildings and other property suffered.

The island of Barbados suffered immensely. Much of the shipping was lost, while three people were killed. The storm also prevented communication via boat to neighboring ports until after its passing.

Some of the most intense damage throughout the storm occurred in Martinique. Of the 40 documented ships in St. Pierre, only 8 survived. Of the surviving 8, only 1 wasn't blown on shore. 2 sailors were also killed. The storm was compared previous major hurricanes that struck in the decades prior.

Despite the intense winds and torrents of rain, no damage was done to the harbor in St. Lucia. A drogher was, however, lost in one of the bays. The storm was said to have been unique and unprecedented. In St. Vincent, winds that blew strongest after daylight caused 3 small vessels to be driven ashore in Kingstown. Likewise to surrounding islands, the oldest inhabitants stated that they couldn't recall anything like this storm happening before. Shipping was disturbed in Grenada, but no damage was reported.

=== Venezuela ===
In Puerto Cabello, heavy rain began around 10 p.m. on December 20th. They continued continuously until the same time the next day. Winds blew with violence from the northwest, although the port remained safe.

Damage dealt to La Guaira was devastating. Conditions began to deteriorate around 11 p.m. on the 20th. By the morning hours, the wind blew greatly from the north. Around this time, Captain Biddle of the USS Congress barely managed to escape west of the port. They loss of their anchors, cables, and 4 men. By 10 p.m. that same day, every ship was lost with the exception of the USS Congress that escaped before the winds reached their zenith. Bad weather continued into morning of the 22nd. The greater area suffered immensely. At least 28 ships, and approximately 100 lives were lost. Only Tropical Storm Bret over 170 years later caused more fatalities by a tropical cyclone in the country.

== See also ==
- List of South America hurricanes
- List of off-season Atlantic hurricanes
- Hurricane Alice (1954/1955) – A similar tracking off-season hurricane that went through the Lesser Antilles.
- Tropical Storm Alma (1974) – A deadly tropical storm that passed over the same areas of Venezuela.
- 1933 Trinidad hurricane – The most recent hurricane to strike Venezuela.
- Hurricane Otto – Another low latitude hurricane that made a landfall late into the calendar year.
