= 2009–10 Southern Hemisphere tropical cyclone season =

The 2009–10 Southern Hemisphere tropical cyclone season which is made up of three different basins and respective seasons; the

- 2009–10 South-West Indian Ocean cyclone season west of 90°E,
- 2009–10 Australian region cyclone season between 90°E and 160°E, and
- 2009–10 South Pacific cyclone season east of 160°E.

In addition, Tropical Storm Anita formed in the South Atlantic Ocean in March. This is only the second recorded tropical cyclone in the South Atlantic after Hurricane Catarina in March 2004.
