= 2003–04 Southern Hemisphere tropical cyclone season =

The 2003–04 Southern Hemisphere tropical cyclone season comprises three different basins. Their respective seasons are:

- 2003–04 South-West Indian Ocean cyclone season west of 90°E,
- 2003–04 Australian region cyclone season between 90°E and 160°E, and
- 2003–04 South Pacific cyclone season east of 160°E.

In addition to the three basins, there were two cyclones that developed in the south Atlantic Ocean. One weak cyclone developed in January and another in March which reached hurricane intensity and hit Brazil, known as Hurricane Catarina.
