= List of South America hurricanes =

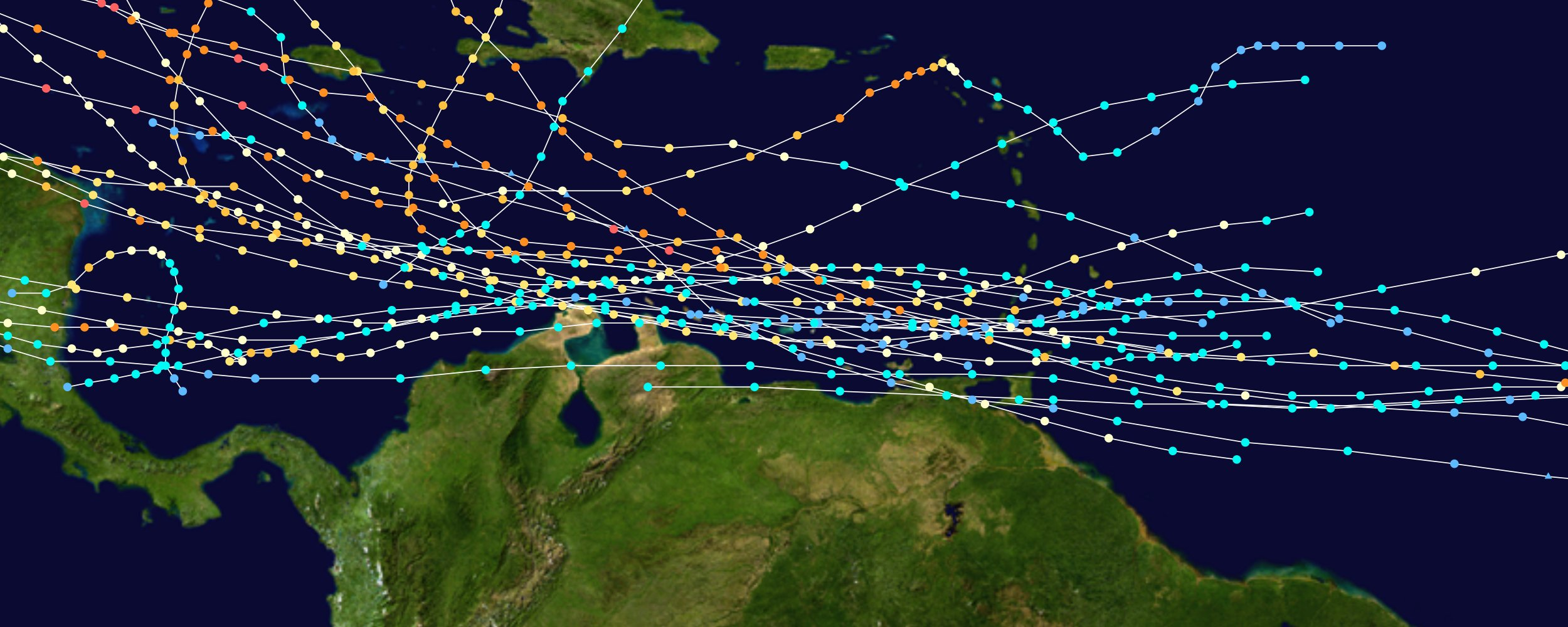
Track map of all North Atlantic tropical cyclones affecting South America from 1850 to 2005

A South American hurricane is a tropical cyclone that affects the continent of South America or its countries. The continent is rarely affected by tropical cyclones, though most storms to hit the area are formed in the North Atlantic Ocean. Typically, strong upper-level winds and its proximity to the equator prevents North Atlantic impacts. Cyclone Yaku is the only known tropical cyclone to have ever affected the Pacific side of South America on record, albeit its status as a tropical cyclone is unofficial. Although conditions are typically too hostile for many storms to hit the area from the South Atlantic Ocean, there have been a few tropical cyclones to affect land. Based on climatology, northern Venezuela and Colombia have a 1 to 5% chance of a hurricane strike in any given year, while all locations south of 10° N have less than a 1% chance of a direct hit.

== Storms in the South Atlantic ==
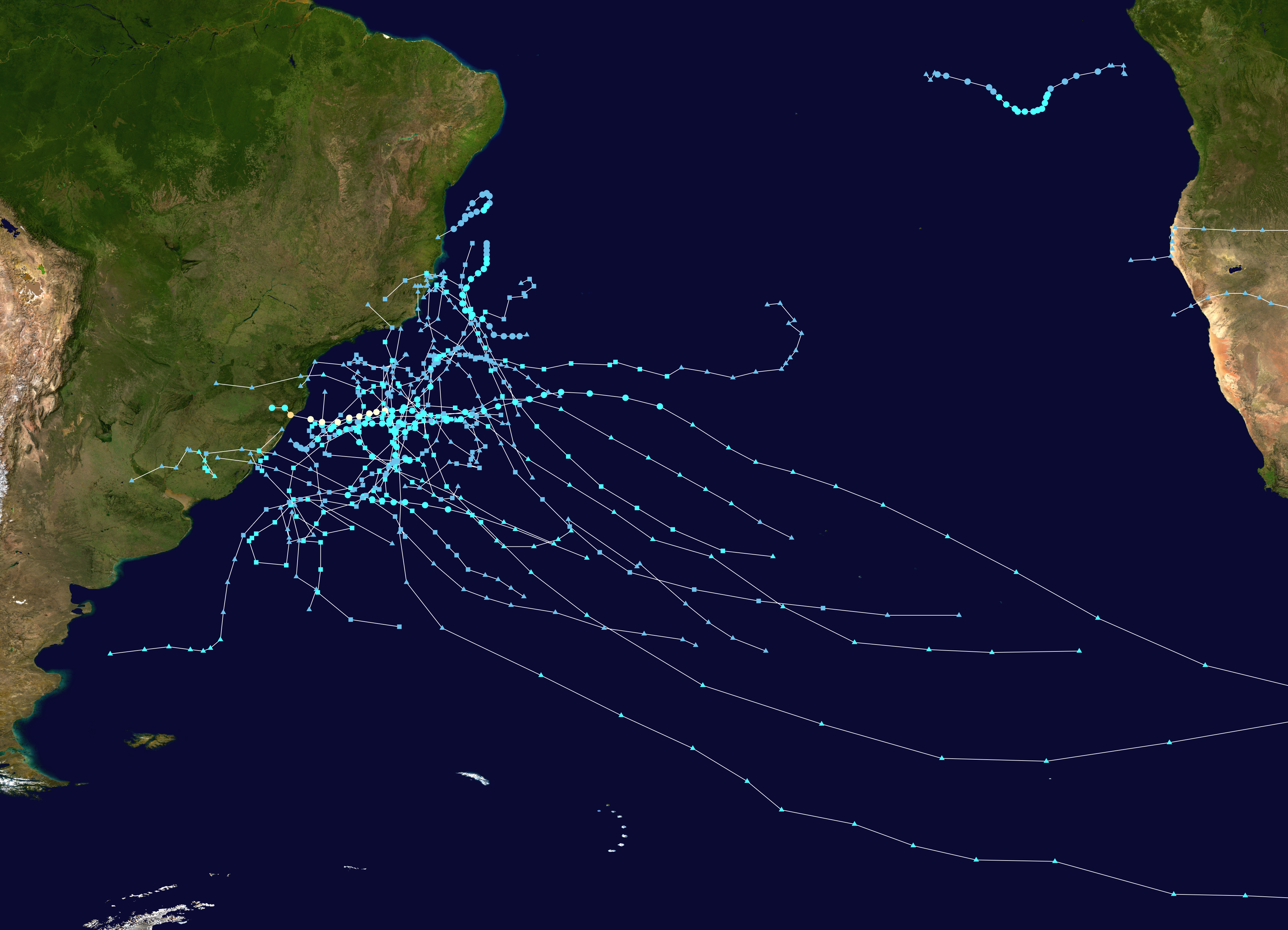
Summary map of most recognized South Atlantic tropical and subtropical cyclones from 1991–2026

South Atlantic tropical cyclones are unusual weather events that occur in the Southern Hemisphere. Strong wind shear, which disrupts the formation of cyclones, as well as a lack of weather disturbances favorable for development in the South Atlantic Ocean, make any strong tropical system extremely rare, and Hurricane Catarina in 2004 is the only recorded South Atlantic hurricane in history. Storms can develop year-round in the South Atlantic, with activity peaking during the months from November through May. Since 2011, the Brazilian Navy Hydrographic Center has assigned names to tropical and subtropical systems in the western side of the basin, near the eastern coast of Brazil, when they have sustained wind speeds of at least 65 km/h (40 mph), the generally accepted minimum sustained wind speed for a disturbance to be designated as a tropical storm in the North Atlantic basin. Below is a list of notable South Atlantic tropical and subtropical cyclones.

== List of tropical cyclones ==
=== 1588–1900 ===
- November 4–6, 1588 – Cartagena de Indias in Colombia is affected by a hurricane.
- September, 1672 – A hurricane affects Caracas, Venezuela.
- October 22, 1683 – The island of Curaçao off Venezuela is impacted by a hurricane.
- September, 1773 – A hurricane moves across Venezuela and later Colombia.
- December 13–22, 1822 – The 1822 Martinique–Venezuela hurricane traversed the Caribbean Sea before making a landfall in Venezuela. Reportedly, 60–100 died in La Guaira, Venezuela alone. It also unofficially holds the record for the latest landfall in the Western Hemisphere.
- October 13, 1847 – Venezuela is affected by a hurricane.
- September 23, 1877 – A 105 mph (170 km/h) Category 2 hurricane makes landfall on northern Venezuela, causing winds of up to 80 mph (130 km/h) in Curaçao.
- September 17, 1886 – A Category 2 hurricane parallels the north coast of Venezuela, causing winds of up to 40 mph (65 km/h) in Curaçao.
- December 10, 1887 – A tropical storm passes just north of the Guajira Department of Colombia.
- October 8, 1892 – A Category 2 hurricane hits Northern Venezuela and Colombia, causing rough seas in Curaçao.

=== 20th century ===
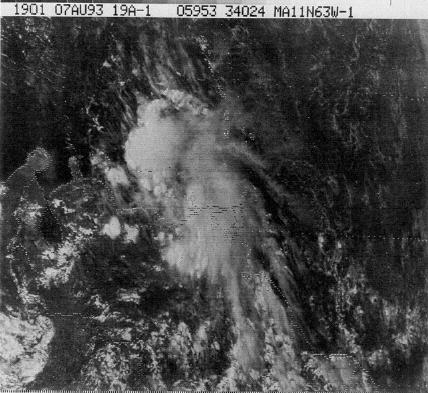
Tropical Storm Bret (1993) near Venezuelan landfall

- September 5, 1911 – Curaçao experiences a westward moving tropical storm which passes near the northern coasts of Venezuela and Colombia.
- November 2–5, 1932 – A Category 2 hurricane parallels the north coast of Venezuela and Colombia 75 miles (120 km) offshore, causing some damage. Later, it passes to the northeast of Providencia Island, destroying 36 houses and ruining crops.
- June 27, 1933 – A minimal hurricane moves through northeastern Venezuela. The hurricane destroys several houses, businesses, and fishing boats. Powerful winds cut telephonic and telegraphic communications for several days. The hurricane killed several people, and caused over $200,000 in damage (1933 USD, $3.3 million 2008 USD).
- October 8, 1954 – Hurricane Hazel parallels the north coasts of Venezuela and Colombia around 100 miles (160 km) offshore as a Category 3 hurricane, though effects, if any, are unknown.
- September 25, 1955 – Hurricane Janet parallels the north coasts of Venezuela and Colombia around 100 miles (160 km) offshore as a Category 4 hurricane, though effects, if any, are unknown.
- July 20, 1961 – Hurricane Anna passes 75 miles (120 km) north of the coast of Venezuela, though effects, if any, are unknown.
- October 1, 1963 – Hurricane Flora strikes Tobago and remains just offshore of Venezuela as it moves through the Caribbean Sea as a Category 3 hurricane. Damage in Venezuela, if any, is unknown.
- September 7, 1971 – A tropical depression intensifies into Tropical Storm Edith near the north coast of Venezuela. The southern portion of the depression's circulation moves over the northeastern portion of the country. Effects are unknown.
- September 16, 1971 – A tropical depression that later becomes Hurricane Irene crosses the island of Curaçao. Effects are unknown.
- August 14, 1974 – Tropical Storm Alma makes landfall on northeastern Venezuela and later dissipates over the mountainous country. Intense rain bands cause a passenger plane to crash on Isla Margarita, resulting in 47 indirect deaths. Damage is unknown.
- August 12, 1978 – Tropical Depression Cora dissipates near the island of Curaçao, causing no known impact.
- September 13, 1978 – A tropical depression that later becomes Hurricane Greta forms near the northeastern coast of Venezuela, causing no known damage.
- September 10–12, 1988 – Outflow bands from Hurricane Gilbert produce flash flooding in northern Venezuela. The flooding killed five people.
- October 16–18, 1988 – Tropical Storm Joan strikes northern Venezuela and Colombia. The storm produces flash flooding which kills 11 in Venezuela. In Colombia, rainfall from Joan kills 25, and leaves 27,000 homeless.
- August 14, 1990 – Minimal Tropical Storm Fran dissipates over northeastern Venezuela, with no known impact.
- August 7–9, 1993 – Tropical Storm Bret moves across northern Venezuela and Colombia. In Venezuela, the storm drops at least 13.35 inches (339 mm) in Guanare. The rainfall causes mudslides, particularly near the city of Caracas, that cover many low-income housing units. Of the 173 deaths caused by Bret in Venezuela, most occur in the low-income areas near Caracas. Lack of preparation, including weather forecasters prematurely stating the worst of the storm is over, is part of the problem. In all, 10,000 are left homeless, and damaged totals $25 million (1993 USD, $37 million 2008 USD). In Colombia, Bret causes one death and one injury.
- July 24–27, 1996 – Hurricane Cesar moves westward across the southern Caribbean and crosses over extreme northern Colombia and the San Andrés archipelago. Cesar kills 11 people in Colombia due to flooding and mudslides.
- November 13–16, 1999 – Strong waves from Hurricane Lenny affect the Guajira Peninsula of Colombia, flooding 1,200 homes and businesses along the northern coastline. In addition, winds and rains from the hurricane causes severe crop damage in the country. The hurricane kills two in Colombia.

=== 2000–2023 ===
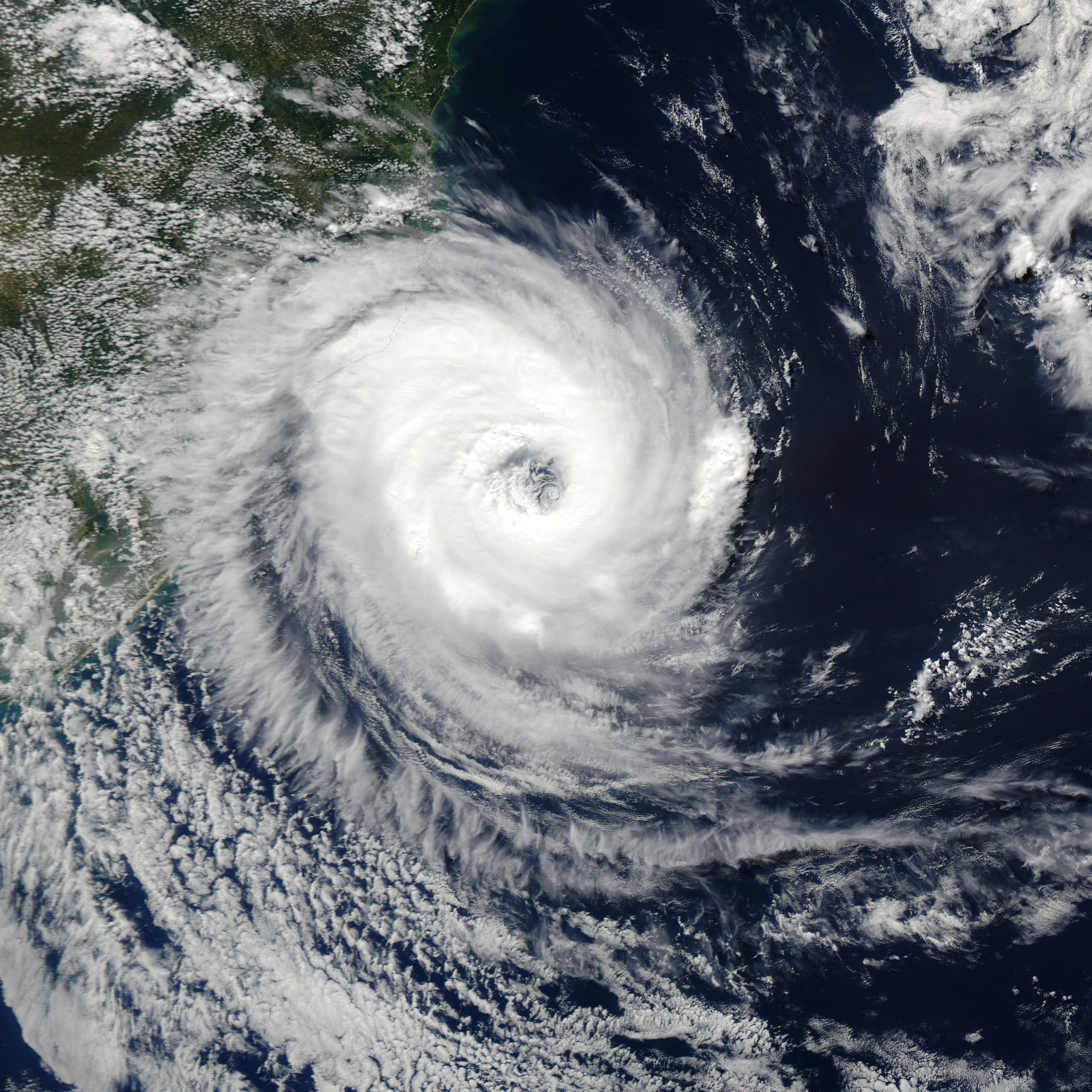
Hurricane Catarina near its landfall in Brazil

- September 25, 2000 – Hurricane Joyce dissipates just north of eastern Venezuela, causing no known damage.
- September 14, 2002 – Hurricane Isidore crosses over northeastern Venezuela as a tropical depression. Effects, if any, are unknown.
- December 4, 2003 – Tropical Storm Odette produces heavy rainfall of up to 8 inches (200 mm) in Colombia.
- January 20, 2004 – A possible tropical storm or depression in the South Atlantic Ocean hits eastern Brazil, dropping heavy rainfall in the area.
- March 28, 2004 – A cyclone, unofficially named Hurricane Catarina, strikes southeastern Brazil with maximum recorded winds of 100 mph(155 km/h). The hurricane damaged more than 30,000 homes and left 1,900 people homeless. The storm also damaged 1,373 businesses and destroyed 50, including a hospital. The storm killed 3, injured 38, and caused up to $330 million in damage (2004 USD). This was the first hurricane ever reported in the Atlantic, south of the equator.
- September 7–9, 2004 – Hurricane Ivan parallels the north coast of Venezuela as a Category 4 hurricane. Ivan's strong winds forced the closure of several airports. The hurricane also produced heavy rainfall and strong waves. Ivan killed three in the country, though overall damage was minor.
- July 14, 2005 – Hurricane Emily passes just north of Venezuela as a strengthening hurricane, causing heavy rains and flooding in the northeastern portion of the country. 64 families were forced to leave their homes when rivers in eastern Monagas state overflowed their banks, but waters quickly receded. Ships were forced to remain at port while the hurricane passed to the country's north, though restrictions quickly lifted.
- October 29, 2005 – Hurricane Beta hits the Colombian island of Providencia, and tears the roofs off of thousands of homes. High winds also shut down all airports and communications.
- September 2, 2007 – Strong winds and waves from Hurricane Felix left one person missing in the coastal Venezuelan city of Puerto Cabello.
- January 28, 2009 – A cold-core mid to upper-level trough in phase with a low-level warm-core low formed a system over Uruguay and Rio Grande do Sul state in Brazil and moved eastward into the South Atlantic. The system was eventually classified as a subtropical cyclone, making it the only subtropical cyclone on record to affect South America, and the second subtropical system ever recorded in the South Atlantic, with the first being a subtropical cyclone in 1974. Winds exceeded 54 knots (100 km/h; 62 mph) on the coast of Uruguay and extreme southern Rio Grande do Sul, and the system produced 300 mm (12 in) of rainfall or more in 24 hours in some locations of Rocha (Uruguay) and southern Rio Grande do Sul. Fourteen deaths and thousands of evacuees are attributed to the storm with an emergency declared in four cities.
- March 10, 2010 – Unofficially named (by private and public weather centers from Southern Brazil) Tropical Storm Anita affected the coast of southern Brazil. The cyclone develops out of a subtropical cyclone and is one of the rare tropical cyclones developed in South Atlantic Ocean waters.
- September 23, 2010 – In Caracas, Venezuela, heavy rains associated with Tropical Storm Matthew triggered significant flooding that destroyed several homes, killing at least seven people. Another person, a 70-year-old man, was swept away by a swollen river in the northeastern state of Sucre later that day.
- Early November 2010 – Hurricane Tomas produces strong winds and heavy rainfall on Isla Aves, located off the northern coast of Venezuela.
- March 10, 2011 – Before becoming a subtropical cyclone, Subtropical Storm Arani produces torrential rains over Brazil. Damage is unknown.
- March 10–13, 2015 – Subtropical Storm Cari stalls offshore Brazil, dropping up to 6 in (150 mm) of rain, strong waves, and strong winds.
- September 30, 2016 – Hurricane Matthew affected the coast of Colombia with tropical storm-force winds and flooding rains. Rainfall in Cartagena reached 8.7 in (222 mm) during a 24-hour span and Santa Marta saw 5.5 in (140 mm). One person died in Aribia in Colombia due to flooding.
- June 19–20, 2017 – Tropical Storm Bret makes landfall in Trinidad and Tobago, causing one death in Trinidad and another in Tobago, before making landfall in Venezuela. The storm results in strong winds and flooding, which caused millions of dollars in damage.
- September 22–23, 2019 – Tropical Storm Karen brought severe flash floods to Tobago, trapping some people in their houses, as well as uprooting trees and causing several power outages. Several roads were blocked due to mudslides and downed trees. In addition, seven boats in Plymouth sank after a jetty broke. It was also announced that all schools would be closed on Monday, September 23. Swells generated by Karen caused flooding and power outages in Caracas and La Guaira.
- January 23–24, 2020 – Subtropical Storm Kurumí in the South Atlantic generated heavy rainfall across Belo Horizonte in southeast Brazil, with a 24-hour rainfall total of 171.8 mm (6.764 in) recorded from January 23 to 24, the highest in 110 years. Mudslides killed at least three people and damaged several buildings. Kurumí served to worsen ongoing flooding associated with an unusually active summer monsoon.
- November 15–16, 2020 – Hurricane Iota as a tropical wave caused heavy flooding in mainland Colombia. An estimated 70 percent of Cartagena saw flooding due to the direct effects of Iota. Subsequently, Iota passed very near the Archipelago of San Andrés, Providencia and Santa Catalina as a high end Category 4 hurricane; the first to ever strike Colombia. Across the country, at least 7 people died and another 10 were left missing.
- April 21, 2021 – Subtropical Storm Potira caused flooding in the streets and damage to the sidewalks in the Brazilian municipalities of Balneário Camboriú and Florianópolis.
- December 12, 2021 – Subtropical Storm Ubá affected southern Brazil, causing heavy rains in Minas Gerais, Espírito Santo and southern Bahia, where heavy precipitation accumulated 450 mm (18 in) in Itamaraju and 331 mm (13 in) in Monte Formoso, killing fifteen people.
- May 17, 2022 – Heavy rains from Subtropical Storm Yakecan kill two people in Uruguay and Brazil.
- June 30, 2022 – The precursor to Tropical Storm Bonnie made landfall in northern Venezuela and northern Colombia.
- October 9, 2022 – Hurricane Julia caused widespread flooding and landslides. In Las Tejerías, in north-central Venezuela, at least 50 people died when mud and debris inundated the town.
- March 7–20, 2023 – An extremely rare system, unofficially named Yaku, brings severe flooding to Ecuador and Peru, killing at least eight people.

== Listed by month ==
44 tropical cyclones have affected South America in most months of the year.

Month	Number of recorded storms affecting South America
January	2
February	0
March	5
April	0
May	0
June	2
July	3
August	4
September	14
October	8
November	4
December	3

== Deadliest storms ==
Data from South American tropical cyclones is sparse and incomplete, though most tropical cyclones that struck the continent caused multiple deaths. Bret, Julia, Joan, and Cesar all caused their deaths through rainfall or flash flooding.

Name	Year	Number of deaths
Bret	1993	174
Joan	1988	36
Cesar	1996	17
Ubá	2021	15
Unnamed	2009	14
Matthew	2010	8
Yaku	2023	8
Iota	2020	7
Gilbert	1988	5
Catarina	2004	3
Ivan	2004	3
Kurumí	2020	3
Lenny	1999	2
Bret	2017	2
Yakecan	2022	2
Hattie	1961	1
Matthew	2016	1
"Trinidad"	1933	"Several"
"Martinique–Venezuela"	1822	"Several"
Alma	1974	0 (47 indirect)
Julia	2022	0 (54 indirect)

== Tropical cyclone warnings and watches ==
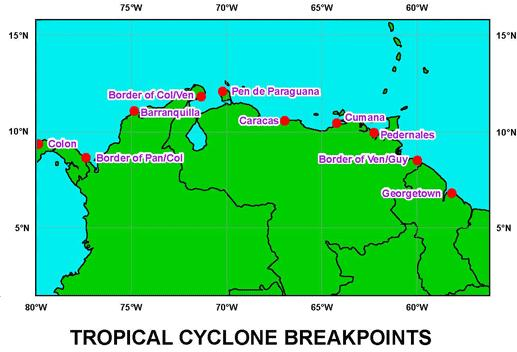
Tropical Cyclone Breakpoints in South America

In the event an Atlantic hurricane threatens the northern coast of South America, the National Hurricane Center defines nine locations as tropical cyclone warning breakpoints. The westernmost is the border between Panama and Colombia, and the easternmost is Georgetown, Guyana, located at 6.82° N. In the eastern Pacific Ocean, tropical cyclone warning breakpoints extend eastward to the border of Panama and Colombia at 7.23° N. No Atlantic hurricane has existed south of 6.82° N, and no Pacific hurricane has existed east of 80° W, though in the event a tropical cyclone threatens a region of South America without warnings, additional warning sites can be selected. In addition to warnings on the mainland of South America, the National Hurricane Center defines the entire island of San Andres as a tropical cyclone warning breakpoint.

Intense Hurricane Flora in 1963 prompted officials to declare gale warnings for two islands off the north coast of Venezuela. In 1974, the passage of Tropical Storm Alma warranted the issuance of Gale Warnings for the Paria and Paraguaná Peninsulas. Hurricane Joan in 1988, Tropical Storm Bret in 1993, Hurricane Cesar in 1996, and Hurricane Felix in 2007 resulted in tropical storm and hurricane watches and warnings for several locations in South America. The threat of Hurricane Ivan prompted a hurricane watch and a tropical storm warning for the northern coast of Venezuela.

== See also ==
- South Atlantic tropical cyclone
- Atlantic hurricane season
- Lists of Atlantic hurricanes
- Tropical cyclone
- Effects of Hurricane Ivan in the Lesser Antilles and South America
