= Hurricane Joan–Miriam =

Category 4 Atlantic and Pacific hurricane in 1988

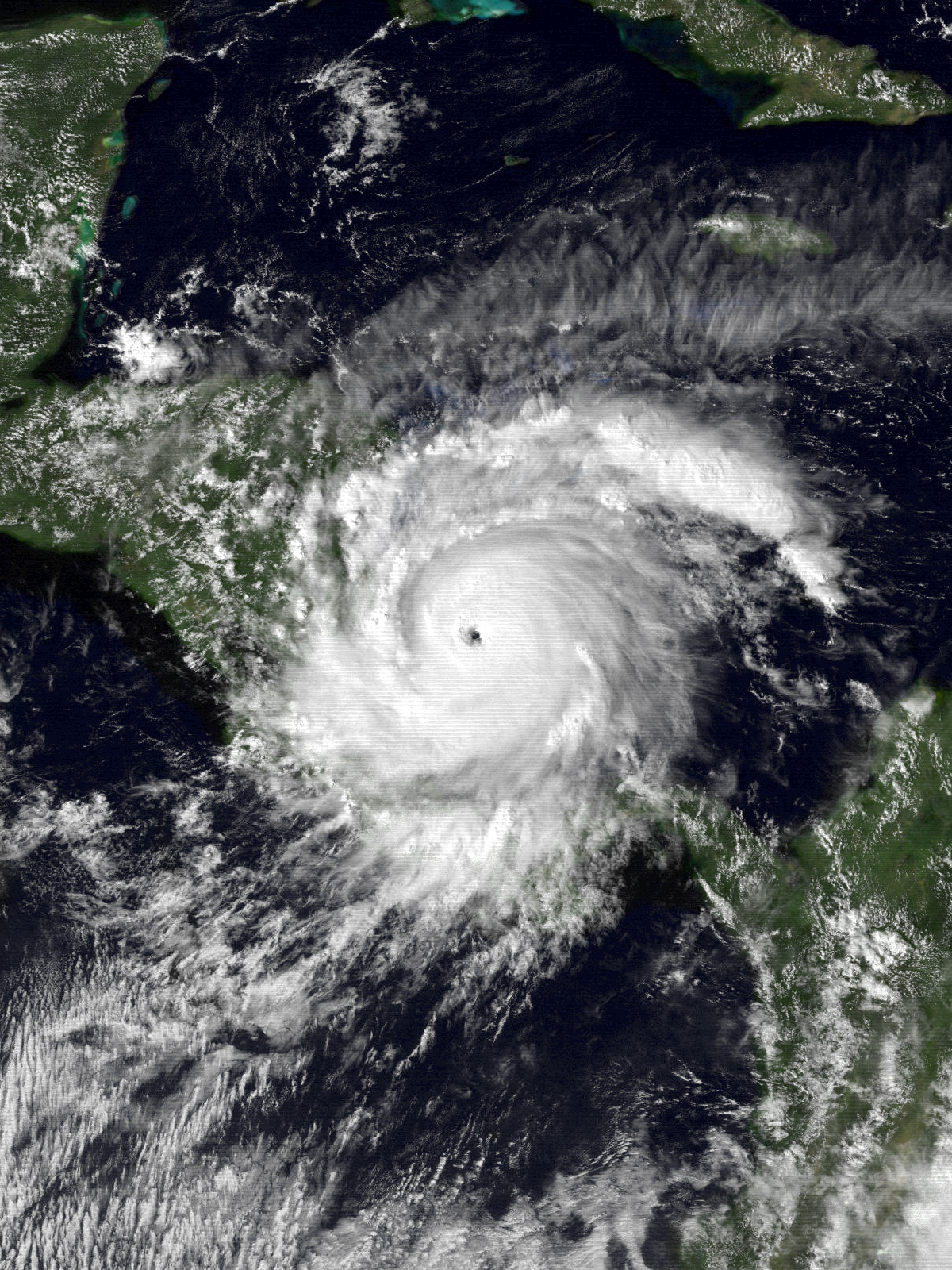
- Hurricane Joan near peak intensity on October 21 east of Costa Rica

Meteorological history
- Formed: October 10, 1988
- Dissipated: November 2, 1988

Category 4 major hurricane
- 1-minute sustained (SSHWS/NWS)
- Highest winds: 145 mph (230 km/h)
- Lowest pressure: 932 mbar (hPa); 27.52 inHg

Overall effects
- Fatalities: 216-337 total (all as Joan)
- Damage: $2 billion (1988 USD)
- Areas affected: Windward Islands, Aruba, Bonaire, Curaçao, Colombia, Venezuela, Costa Rica, Panama (as Joan), El Salvador, Guatemala, Mexico (as Miriam), Nicaragua (as both)
- IBTrACS
- Part of the 1988 Atlantic and Pacific hurricane seasons

Hurricane Joan was a long lived and powerful tropical cyclone that caused death and destruction in over a dozen countries in the Caribbean and Central America. Moving on a due west course for nearly two weeks in October 1988, Hurricane Joan caused widespread flooding and over 200 deaths after moving into Central America. Widespread suffering and economic crises were exacerbated by Joan, primarily across Nicaragua, as heavy rains and high winds impacted those near the hurricane's path.

After crossing Central America into the Pacific, the cyclone was renamed Tropical Storm Miriam, with the system's dissipation occurring southwest of Mexico. Joan–Miriam was the final hurricane of the 1988 Atlantic hurricane season and the final named storm of the Pacific hurricane season.

== Meteorological history ==
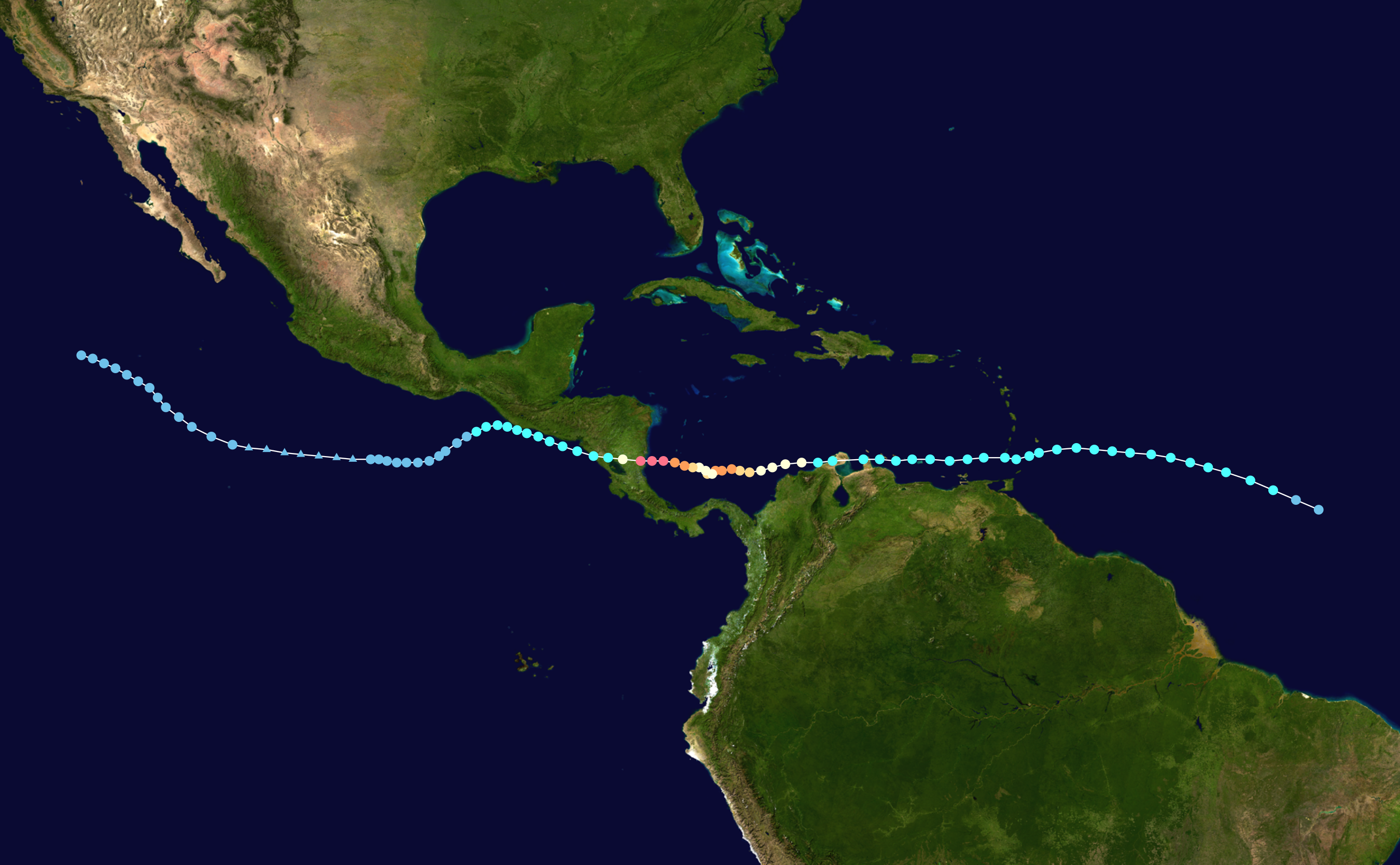
Map plotting the storm's track and intensity, according to the Saffir–Simpson scale Map key Saffir–Simpson scale Tropical depression (≤38 mph, ≤62 km/h) Tropical storm (39–73 mph, 63–118 km/h) Category 1 (74–95 mph, 119–153 km/h) Category 2 (96–110 mph, 154–177 km/h) Category 3 (111–129 mph, 178–208 km/h) Category 4 (130–156 mph, 209–251 km/h) Category 5 (≥157 mph, ≥252 km/h) Unknown Storm type Tropical cyclone Subtropical cyclone Extratropical cyclone, remnant low, tropical disturbance, or monsoon depression

At the time, Joan was one of the latest tropical cyclones to form in the central Atlantic in any season. It formed from an area of convection in the Intertropical Convergence Zone that moved off the coast of Africa early in October. It developed banding and was upgraded to Tropical Depression Seventeen on October 10 and later designated as Tropical Storm Joan while located at low latitude in the central Atlantic Ocean.

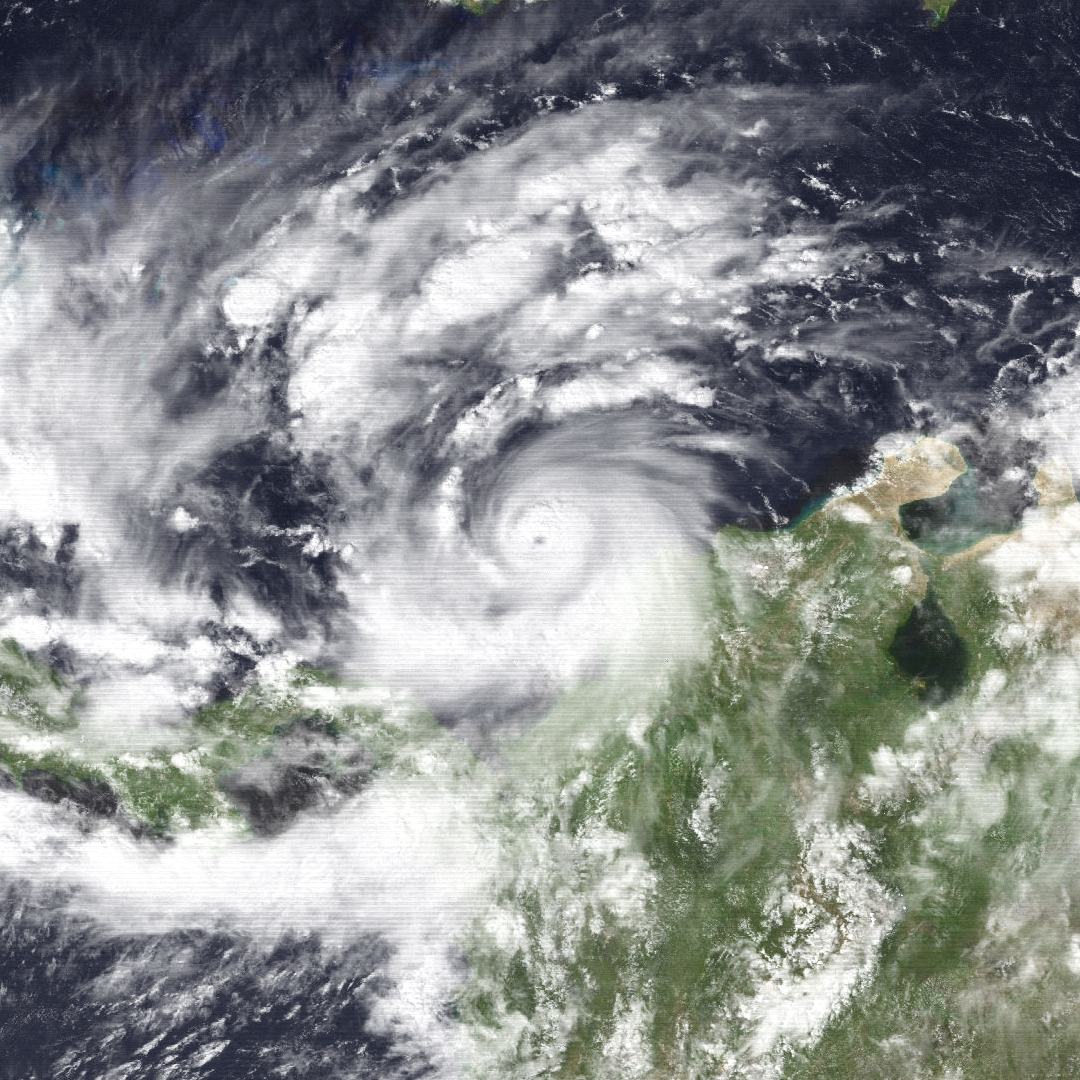
Hurricane Joan off the Colombian coast on October 18

Joan gradually strengthened as it passed over the southern Windward Islands on October 15. It continued heading west in response to a strong ridge, and passed over the Guajira Peninsula on October 17. After entering the extreme southwestern Caribbean Sea, Joan strengthened into a hurricane. It then slowly executed a small counterclockwise loop, possibly in response to the nearby Tropical Depression Eighteen. Upwelling caused by the quasi-stationary hurricane weakened the system. As the nearby depression dissipated, Joan resumed its westward track. A strong anticyclone over the southwestern Caribbean Sea created an extremely favorable environment, and Joan underwent rapid deepening at a rate of 38 millibars in the space of a day. With a minimum pressure of 932 millibars, Joan was one of the strongest October hurricanes since 1961. At the time, it was located at 12°N, the southernmost Category 4 hurricane ever recorded at the time. That record has since been broken by Hurricane Ivan.

Joan made landfall just south of Bluefields on October 22. It passed over the northern portion of Lake Nicaragua, passed over Managua, and entered the Pacific Ocean near Leon on October 23. Joan remained a hurricane or tropical storm during its entire passage over Central America, and was a minimal tropical storm when it reached the Pacific. As per the policy at the time, Joan was renamed Miriam.

Tropical Storm Miriam hugged the coast of Central America and reached its peak of 986 millibars on October 24. Ordinarily, a pressure this low would indicate a Category 1 hurricane, but due to its disorganized convection, Miriam was not upgraded to a hurricane. Land interaction and wind shear weakened Miriam to a tropical depression on October 26. Low-level winds carried the system out to sea, and its convection dissipated on October 28.

Miriam's remnants continued out to sea, and they regenerated on October 30. The tropical depression hung on for the next few days, until its second, and final, dissipation on November 2.

=== Unusual path ===
Hurricane Joan's path through the southern Caribbean in late October was highly unusual. Most October storms in the Atlantic gravitate towards the northern portion of the Caribbean, and often recurve quickly. Joan took the southernmost path of an Atlantic-basin tropical cyclone in the Northern Hemisphere since a June system in 1933, although Hurricane Irene in 1971 took a path that was just north of Joan's. Joan-Miriam was also unusual in that it survived the passage from the Atlantic to Pacific Ocean. Only thirteen other storms have been known to survive the crossover between the Atlantic and Pacific oceans.

== Preparations ==
Tropical storm watches and later warnings were issued for the Windward Islands as far north as Martinique on October 13. They were dropped over the subsequent two days as Joan passed through. Along the coast of South America, additional warnings were raised and later dropped as Joan paralleled the coast.

The first hurricane watches were issued for parts of Panama, and Providencia starting on October 18. The watch area was expanded to include Costa Rica and Nicaragua on October 19 as the watches were upgraded to warnings. These warnings provided several hours' worth of lead time, allowing evacuations and preparations to be made. In addition, flash flood and mudslide warnings were issued for western Panama, Costa Rica, Honduras, and Nicaragua starting on October 21.

In response to Miriam, the flood and mudslide warnings issued because of Joan were not lifted until October 23 and 25. Tropical Storm warnings were issued for the Pacific coast of Nicaragua, El Salvador, and the Gulf of Fonseca on October 24. They were dropped the next day. Guatemala was placed under a warning on October 24. In addition, new flash flood and mudslide warnings were raised for Guatemala and the Mexican state of Chiapas on October 24 and 25, respectively. All warnings and watches were discontinued later on October 25 as Miriam turned away from the coast.

Despite the dangers from the intense hurricane, evacuations in Bluefields were met with resistance and disbelief from residents. In Managua, 70,000 people were evacuated to safe areas. In the remaining areas of Nicaragua, 300,000 people were evacuated. In Costa Rica, a total of 55,000 people were evacuated.

== Impact ==
Impact by Country
Country	Deaths	Damage
Nicaragua	148-248	$751.1 million
Costa Rica	28-46	$60 million
Colombia	25	$1 billion
Venezuela	11	Unknown
Panama	7	$60 million
Total	216-337	$1.85 billion

Hurricane Joan killed at least 216 people, with 118 unaccounted for. The total cost of damage was around $2 billion (1988 USD). All of the deaths and most of the damage were due to the Joan portion of Hurricane Joan–Miriam.

=== Lesser Antilles ===
No casualties were reported in the Windward Islands, including Grenada, where, on October 15, Joan made landfall. Passing just south, Joan brought rough seas and winds of 40 mph (65 km/h) with gusts to 55 mph (90 km/h) to the islands of Aruba, Bonaire, and Curaçao on October 16, damaging coastal facilities and roofs. Structural damage from the storm was estimated at $1.5 million (1988 USD). Increased moisture in Joan's wake caused persistent rainfall on the islands for several days, leading to widespread flooding. In Trinidad and Tobago, Joan was described as a "minor inconvenience". Sustained winds up to 51 mph (82 km/h) with gusts up to 64 mph (103 km/h) were recorded on Grenada. Heavy rains amounted to 6 in (150 mm) in St. George's. Significant flooding was reported throughout the island, resulting in hundreds of thousands of dollars in damage. A rare invasion of African desert locusts in the Windward Islands were blamed on the storm.

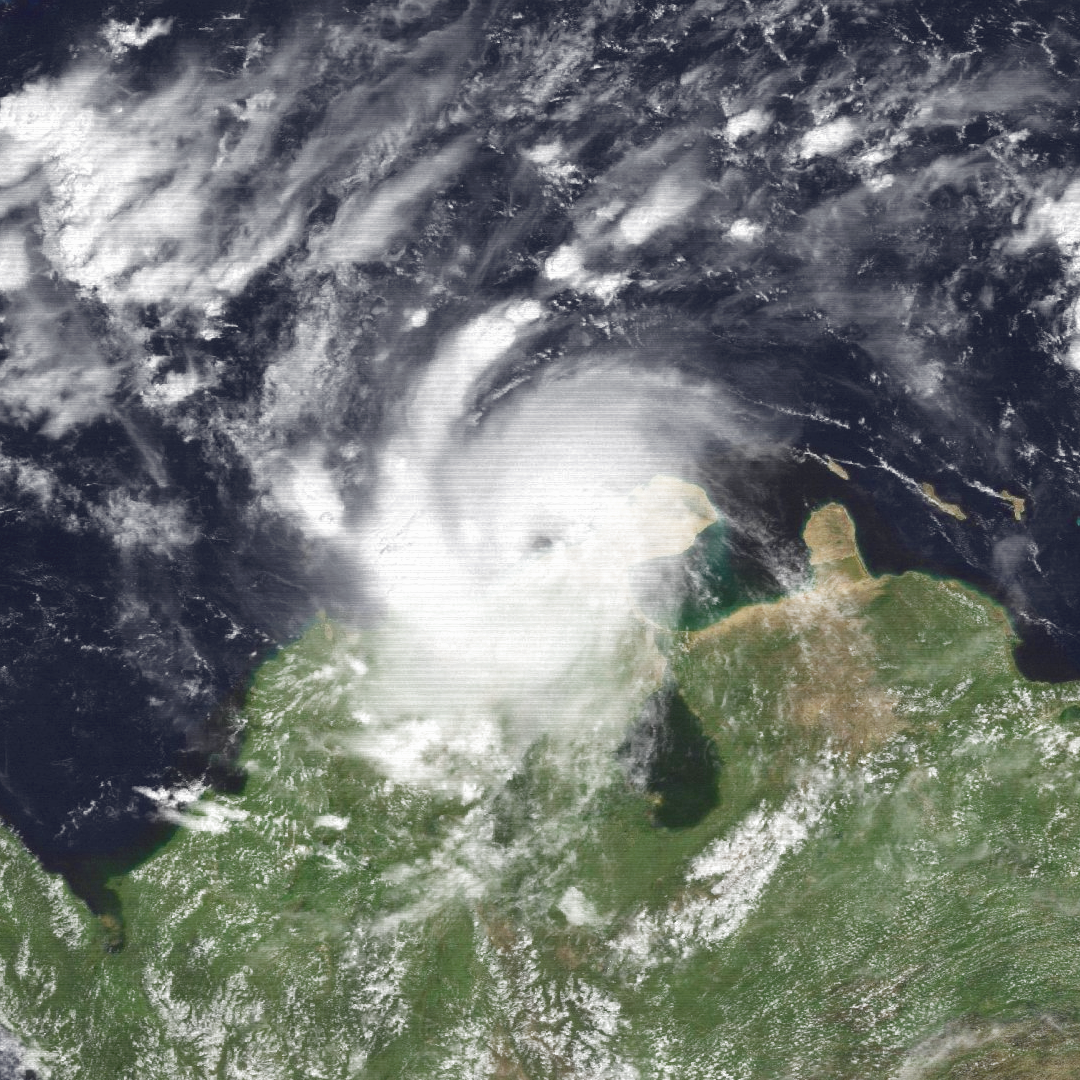
Tropical Storm Joan shortly after passing over the Guajira Peninsula on October 17

=== South America ===
In Venezuela, 11 people were killed due to flash-flooding caused by heavy rains. Landslides and flooding killed 25 people in Colombia. The rains and flooding left 27,000 people homeless. Throughout Colombia, damages amounted to $1 billion.

=== Nicaragua ===
Most of the destruction was in Nicaragua. Throughout the country where it caused catastrophic economic damage, 148 people perished, 184 were badly hurt, and 100 were unaccounted for. Roughly 23,300 homes were destroyed, with 6,000 being damaged. Many settlements on the Atlantic coast of the country were completely destroyed. The national electric company had 620 miles (1,000 km) of downed power lines, at the cost of 2.5 million USD (1988 dollars). A port being constructed with Bulgarian help at El Bluff was severely damaged. On a brighter note, public health measures managed to keep the death toll lower than it could have been.

Bluefields was hit with extreme impact. Almost all of the 7,500 structures in the city were demolished or had their roofs blown off. The majority of the main buildings in the city were destroyed. The hurricane also wreaked havoc on agriculture in the country. Around 15,700 head of cattle, 20,000 pigs, and 456,000 chickens were killed. The hurricane caused severe disruption in most of Nicaragua's remaining rain forests in the areas it hit, and also stripped trees of leaves. In the southeast rain forests, Joan toppled or snapped 80 percent of the trees and completely destroyed 500,000 hectares (1,200,000 acres) of canopy. Hurricane Joan caused transportation difficulties in the country. Floodwaters destroyed 30 bridges and seriously damaged 36 others. Roads totaling 404 miles (650 km) in length were washed away.

In an unfortunate coincidence, Hurricane Joan hit shortly after an armed conflict in the region had started to cool off. The hurricane destroyed much of the infrastructure in Nicaragua, contributing to a recession that was already underway. The losses to cash crops severely reduced exports to under 200 million dollars (1988 USD). These factors combined to aggravate a recession and deepen the economic crisis. Government spending to rebuild infrastructure negated recently introduced anti-inflation measures. Hurricane Joan was a partial cause of Nicaraguans being, on average, worse-off than they were in the 1970s. In all, the storm left at least 250,000 people homeless. Total damages in the country amounted to $751.1 million. Joan was the first major hurricane to strike Nicaragua since Edith in 1971.

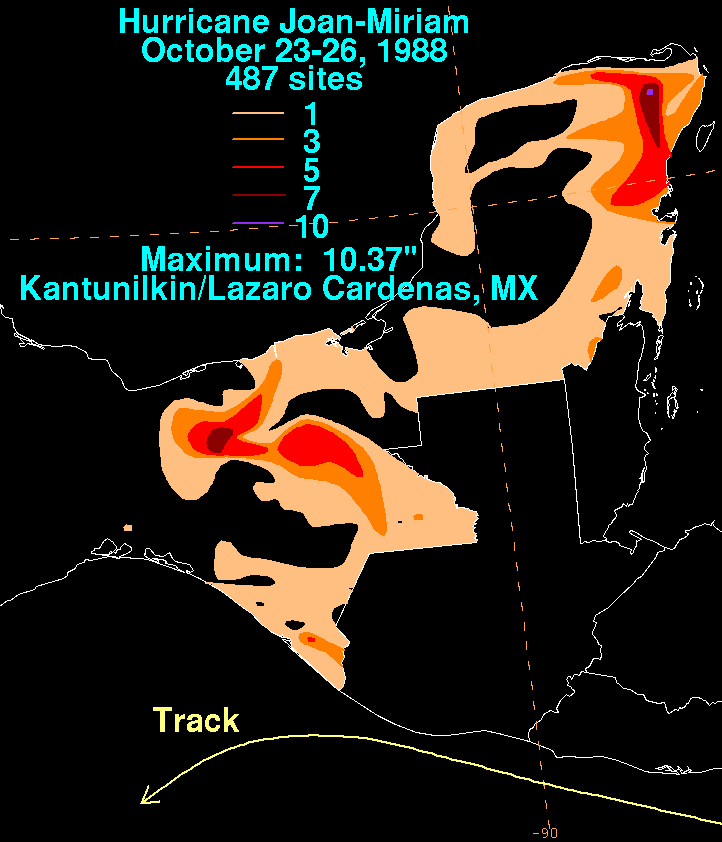
Joan-Miriam's rainfall in Mexico

=== Rest of Central America ===
In Costa Rica, 28 people were killed, 75 were injured, and 18 were missing. Rainfall caused 20 rivers to burst their banks, flooding 75 settlements, including the city of Quepos, Costa Rica on the Pacific coast. At Ciudad Neily, Costa Rica, the Rio Corredores broke through a dike. In total, 7,500 Costa Ricans were rendered homeless. Damages in Costa Rica amounted to $65 million.

In the remaining portions of Central America, heavy rainfall, locally exceeding 300 millimetres (12 in), was reported. These rains caused flooding and landslides, especially in mountainous regions. Those heavy rains caused seven deaths in Panama and left $60 million in damages.

=== Mexico ===
In Mexico, heavy rainfall associated with Tropical Storm Miriam caused the cancellation of flights from the airport at Tuxtla Gutiérrez. The highest rainfall reported recorded was 10.37 inches (263 mm) at Lázaro Cárdenas. In small settlements, rivers were flooded and mudslides were reported. Casualties from the flooding are not known.

== Aftermath ==
The response to requests for international aid was moderate. American church groups, Cuba, and Mexico collectively contributed around 2,500 tons of food and medicine. The Canadian, Swedish, West German, Spanish, and Dutch governments contributed aid amounting to 2 million dollars (1988) each. No aid was sent by the United States government. The Soviet Union contributed an unknown sum. The slow response to requests for aid was contributed to by the Sandinista Government's actions, which was viewed by a few anonymous diplomats from other countries who commented to the press, as undermining the peace process championed by Óscar Arias. Those actions were the July 10 arrests of opposition activists and the closing down of independent radio stations. In addition, the government also barred foreign humanitarian groups from receiving American aid, as well as turning back a relief shipment days before the storm.

On October 28, 1988, the United Nations General Assembly passed without a vote Resolution 17 of its 43rd session in response to the disaster. The resolution called on countries to contribute to the relief effort.

=== Retirement ===
On account of the deaths and destruction caused by the hurricane in the Atlantic basin, the name Joan was retired by the World Meteorological Organization in the spring of 1989. The name Miriam was not retired. Joan was replaced with Joyce for the 1994 Atlantic hurricane season.

== See also ==
- List of Atlantic–Pacific crossover hurricanes
- List of Category 4 Atlantic hurricanes
- List of Eastern Pacific tropical storms
- Hurricane Irene–Olivia (1971)
- Tropical Storm Bret (1993)
- Hurricane Otto (2016)
- Hurricane Iota (2020)
