= Balneário Gaivota =

Coordinates: 29.1569°S 49.5789°W

- Municipality
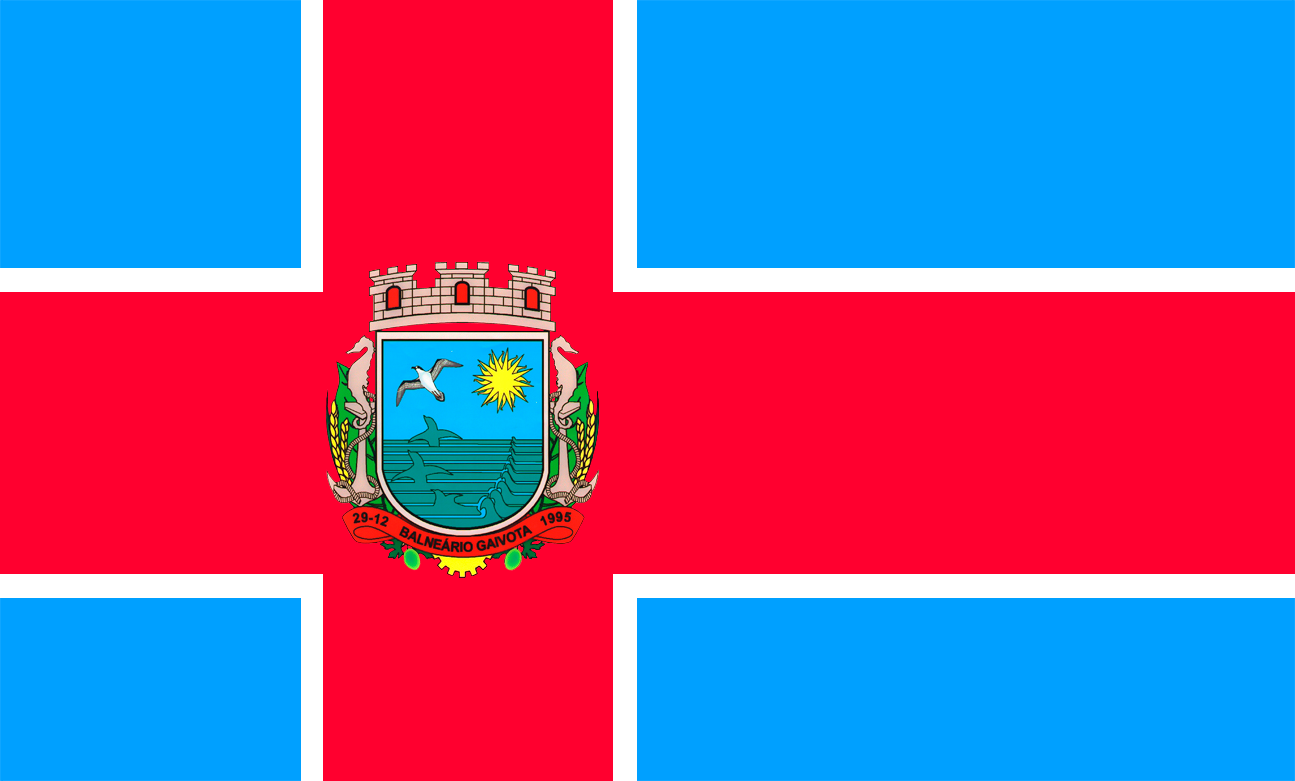
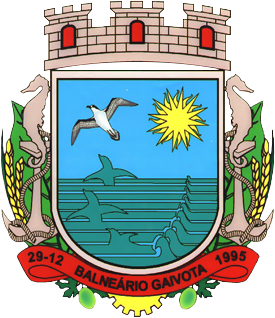
- Flag Coat of arms
- Interactive map of Balneário Gaivota
- Country: Brazil
- Region: South
- State: Santa Catarina
- Mesoregion: Sul Catarinense

Population (2023)
  - Total: 15,669
- Time zone: UTC−3 (BRT)

Balneário Gaivota is a municipality in the state of Santa Catarina in the South region of Brazil. Balneario Gaivota has the largest beach shore in Santa Catarina .

The municipality is known for its beaches, lagoons, and boardwalk. It has 23km of waterfront (the largest in the state of Santa Catarina). The municipality is the top ten nationally for population growth.

The city was emancipated from the neighbouring municipality, Sombrio, on December 29, 1995, through Law 10.054/1995. The locality developed due to the practice of exploratory fishing, an activity that until today, together with tourism and estate properties are one of the main ones in the economy of the municipality.

It makes limits with the municipalities of Sombrio, to the West, Balneário Arroio do Silva, to the North, Passo de Torres, to the South, and the Atlantic Ocean, to the East.

In the summer the city reaches over 100k tourists.

the economy of the city is based in tourism, fisheries and estate properties.

== See also ==
- List of municipalities in Santa Catarina
