= South Atlantic tropical cyclone =

Tropical cyclones in the South Atlantic Ocean

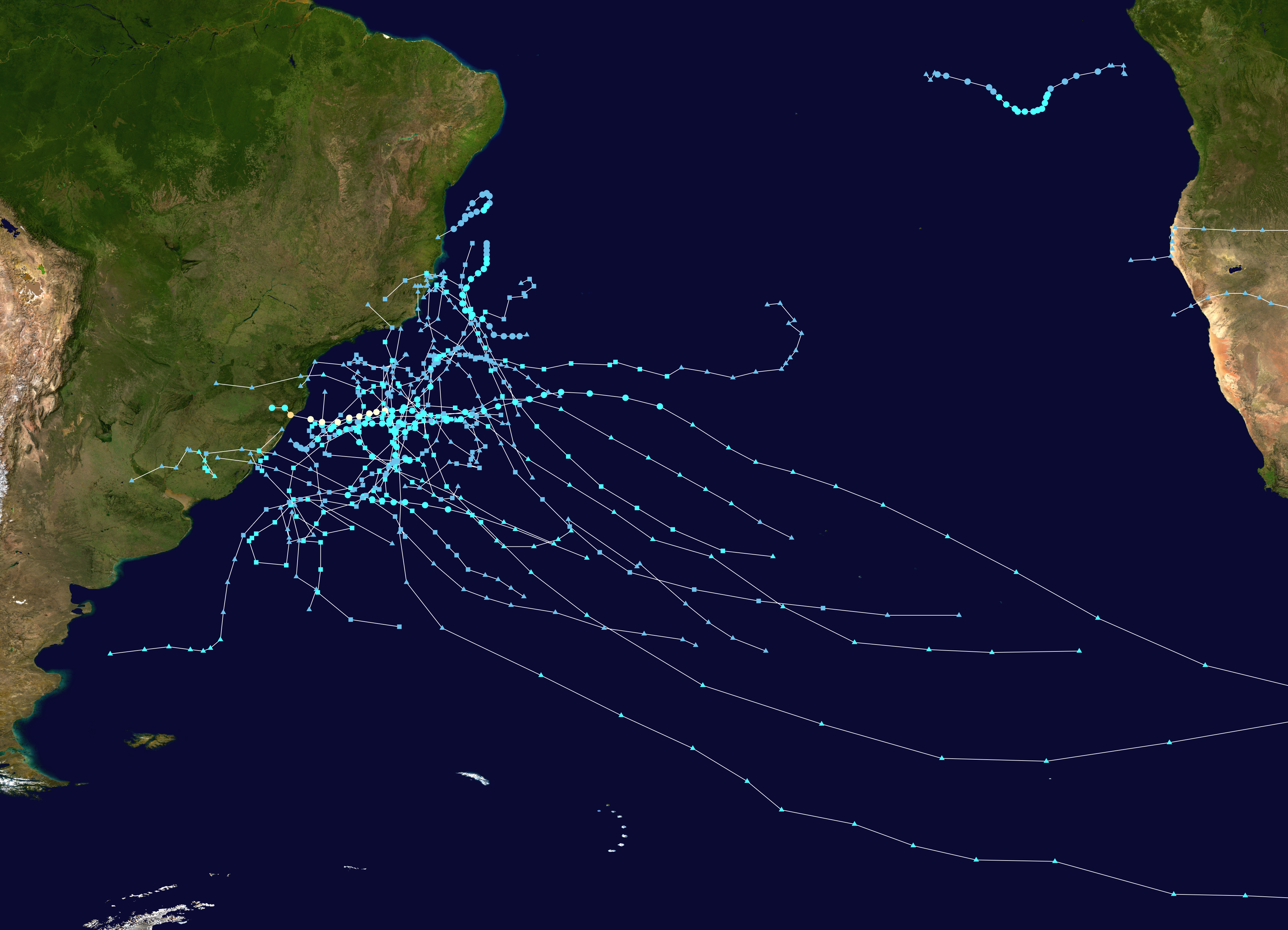
Summary map of most recognized South Atlantic tropical and subtropical cyclones from 1991–2026

South Atlantic tropical cyclones are unusual weather events that occur in the Southern Hemisphere. Strong wind shear, which disrupts the formation of cyclones, as well as a lack of weather disturbances favorable for development in the South Atlantic Ocean, make any strong tropical system extremely rare, and Hurricane Catarina in 2004 is the only recorded South Atlantic hurricane in history. Storms can develop year-round in the South Atlantic, with activity peaking during the months from November through May. Since 2011, the Brazilian Navy Hydrographic Center has assigned names to tropical and subtropical systems in the western side of the basin, near the eastern coast of Brazil, when they have sustained wind speeds of at least 65 km/h (40 mph), the generally accepted minimum sustained wind speed for a disturbance to be designated as a tropical storm in the North Atlantic basin. Below is a list of notable South Atlantic tropical and subtropical cyclones.

== Climatology ==
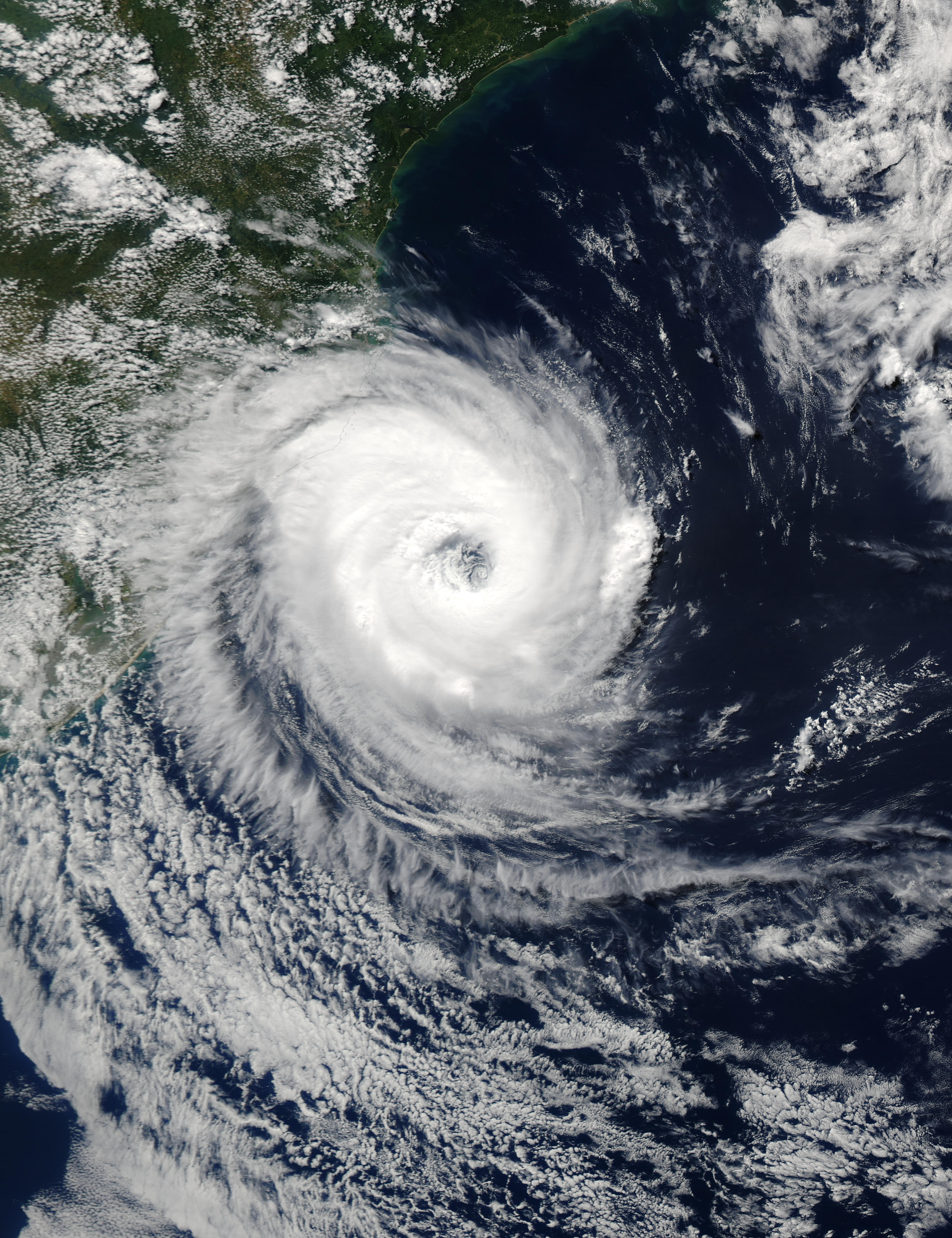
Satellite imagery of Cyclone Catarina, the only officially recorded hurricane in the South Atlantic Ocean

It was initially thought that tropical cyclones did not develop within the South Atlantic. Very strong vertical wind shear in the troposphere is considered a deterrent. The Intertropical Convergence Zone drops one to two degrees south of the equator, not far enough from the equator for the Coriolis force to significantly aid development. Water temperatures in the tropics of the southern Atlantic are cooler than those in the tropical north Atlantic.

Although they are rare, during April 1991 the United States' National Hurricane Center (NHC) reported that a tropical cyclone had developed over the Eastern South Atlantic. In subsequent years, a few systems were suspected to have the characteristics needed to be classified as a tropical cyclone, including in March 1994 and January 2004. During March 2004, an extratropical cyclone formally transitioned into a tropical cyclone and made landfall on Brazil, after becoming a Category 2 hurricane on the Saffir–Simpson hurricane wind scale. While the system was threatening the Brazilian state of Santa Catarina, a newspaper used the headline "Furacão Catarina", which was originally presumed to mean "furacão (hurricane) threatening (Santa) Catarina (the state)". After international presses started monitoring the system, "Hurricane Catarina" has formally been adopted.

== History and warning ==
At the Sixth WMO International Workshop on Tropical Cyclones (IWTC-VI) in 2006, it was questioned if any subtropical or tropical cyclones had developed within the South Atlantic before Catarina. It was noted that suspect systems had developed in January 1970, March 1994, January 2004, March 2004, May 2004, February 2006, and March 2006. It was also suggested that an effort should be made to locate any possible systems using satellite imagery and synoptic data; however, it was noted that this effort may be hindered by the lack of any geostationary imagery over the basin before 1966. A study was subsequently performed and published during 2012, which concluded that there had been 63 subtropical cyclones in the Southern Atlantic between 1957 and 2007.

During January 2009, a subtropical storm developed in the basin, and in March 2010, a tropical storm developed, which was named Anita by the Brazilian public and private weather services. In 2011, the Brazilian Navy Hydrographic Center started to assign names to tropical and subtropical cyclones that develop within its area of responsibility, to the west of 20°W, when they have sustained wind speeds of at least 65 km/h (40 mph).

In July 2025, at the 42nd Session of the International Civil Aviation Organization (ICAO) Assembly, the Brazilian government expressed their intention to establish a Tropical Cyclone Advisory Centre (TCAC) in Rio de Janeiro for METAREA V, which comprises the western side of the South Atlantic ocean and includes the Brazilian coastline, with the Centro Integrado de Meteorologia Aeronáutica (CIMAER) assuming the responsibilities for the region alongside the navy. The plan's goal is to integrate this TCAC into WMO's Tropical Cyclone Programme (TCP) and achieve operational status by December 2026.

== Notable storms and impacts ==
Cyclone Catarina was an extraordinarily rare hurricane-strength tropical cyclone, forming in the southern Atlantic Ocean in March 2004. Soon after becoming a hurricane, it hit the southern coast of Brazil in the state of Santa Catarina on the evening of 28 March, with winds up to 100 miles per hour (160 km/h) making it a Category 2-equivalent cyclone on the Saffir–Simpson hurricane scale. Catarina killed 3 to 11 people and caused millions of dollars in damage in Brazil.

In mid-March 2011, the Navy Hydrographic Center-Brazilian Navy (SMM), in coordination with the National Institute of Meteorology, monitored and named Subtropical Storm Arani off the coast of southern Brazil. In March 2019, the SMM tracked Tropical Storm Iba, which was the first fully tropical system to be named from the Brazilian naming list. The next tropical storm in the basin was Tropical Storm Akará in February 2024.

== Storm names ==
The following names are published by the Brazilian Navy Hydrographic Center's Marine Meteorological Service and used for tropical and subtropical storms that form in the area west of 20ºW and south of equator in the South Atlantic Ocean. Originally announced in 2011, the list was extended from 10 to 15 names in 2018. In 2022, 32 new names were added after the previous ones were exhausted. The names are assigned in alphabetical order and used sequentially without regard to year.

- Arani
- Bapo
- Cari
- Deni
- Eçaí
- Guará
- Iba
- Jaguar
- Kurumí
- Mani
- Oquira
- Potira
- Raoni
- Ubá
- Yakecan
- Akará
- Biguá
- Caiobá
- Endy (unused)
- Guarani (unused)
- Iguaçú (unused)
- Jaci (unused)
- Kaeté (unused)
- Maracá (unused)
- Okanga (unused)
- Poti (unused)
- Reri (unused)
- Sumé (unused)
- Tupã (unused)
- Upaba (unused)
- Ybatinga (unused)
- Aratu (unused)
- Buri (unused)
- Caiçara (unused)
- Esapé (unused)
- Guaí (unused)
- Itã (unused)
- Juru (unused)
- Katu (unused)
- Murici (unused)
- Oryba (unused)
- Peri (unused)
- Reia (unused)
- Samburá (unused)
- Taubaté (unused)
- Uruana (unused)
- Ytu (unused)

=== Retirements ===
Kamby was replaced by Kurumí in 2018 without being used.

== See also ==
- Unusual areas of tropical cyclone formation
- List of South America hurricanes
- Southern Hemisphere tropical cyclone
- Atlantic hurricane (North Atlantic tropical cyclone)
- Atlantic Equatorial mode
- Mediterranean tropical-like cyclone
- Tropical cyclone basins
- 2006 Central Pacific cyclone
- 1996 Lake Huron cyclone
- Subtropical Cyclone Katie
- Subtropical Cyclone Lexi
- Cyclone Yaku
