= Cyclone Yaku =

Low-pressure system in the Southeastern Pacific

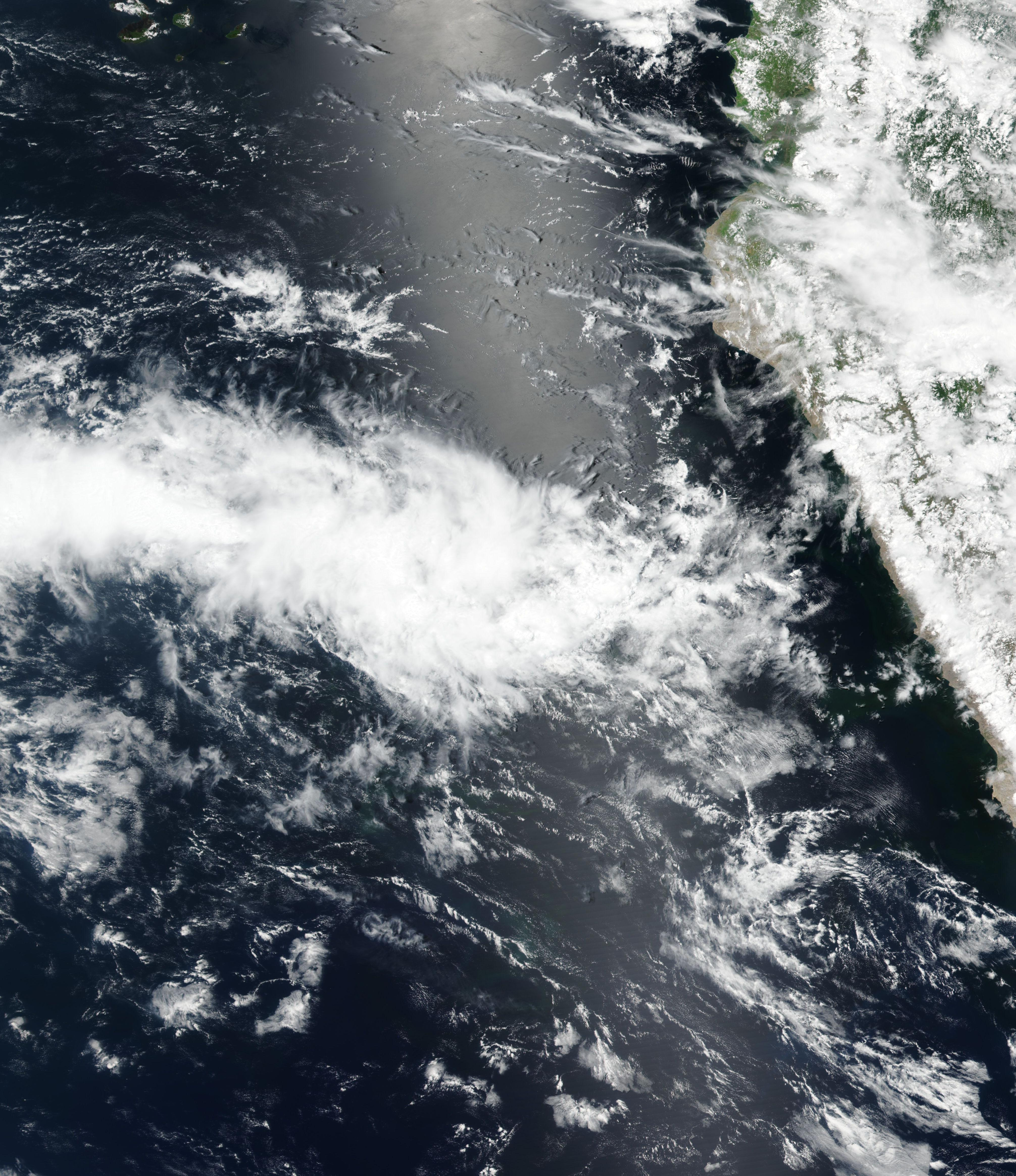
- Yaku off the coast of Peru on 13 March

Meteorological history
- Formed: 7 March 2023
- Dissipated: 20 March 2023

Meteorological information
- Lowest pressure: 1009 hPa (mbar); 29.80 inHg

Overall effects
- Fatalities: ≥8
- Damage: $690 million (2023 USD)
- Areas affected: Peru, Ecuador
- Houses destroyed: >1,312
- Part of the 2022–23 South Pacific cyclone season (unofficially)

Cyclone Yaku was an unusual low-pressure system in the far Southeastern Pacific that impacted Ecuador and northern Peru in early March 2023. It has been described by the National Service of Meteorology and Hydrology of Peru (SENAMHI) as an "unorganized tropical cyclone" not seen since 1983 or 1998. In Peru, the system killed at least eight, affected 49,000 people and destroyed thousands of homes.

== Meteorological history ==
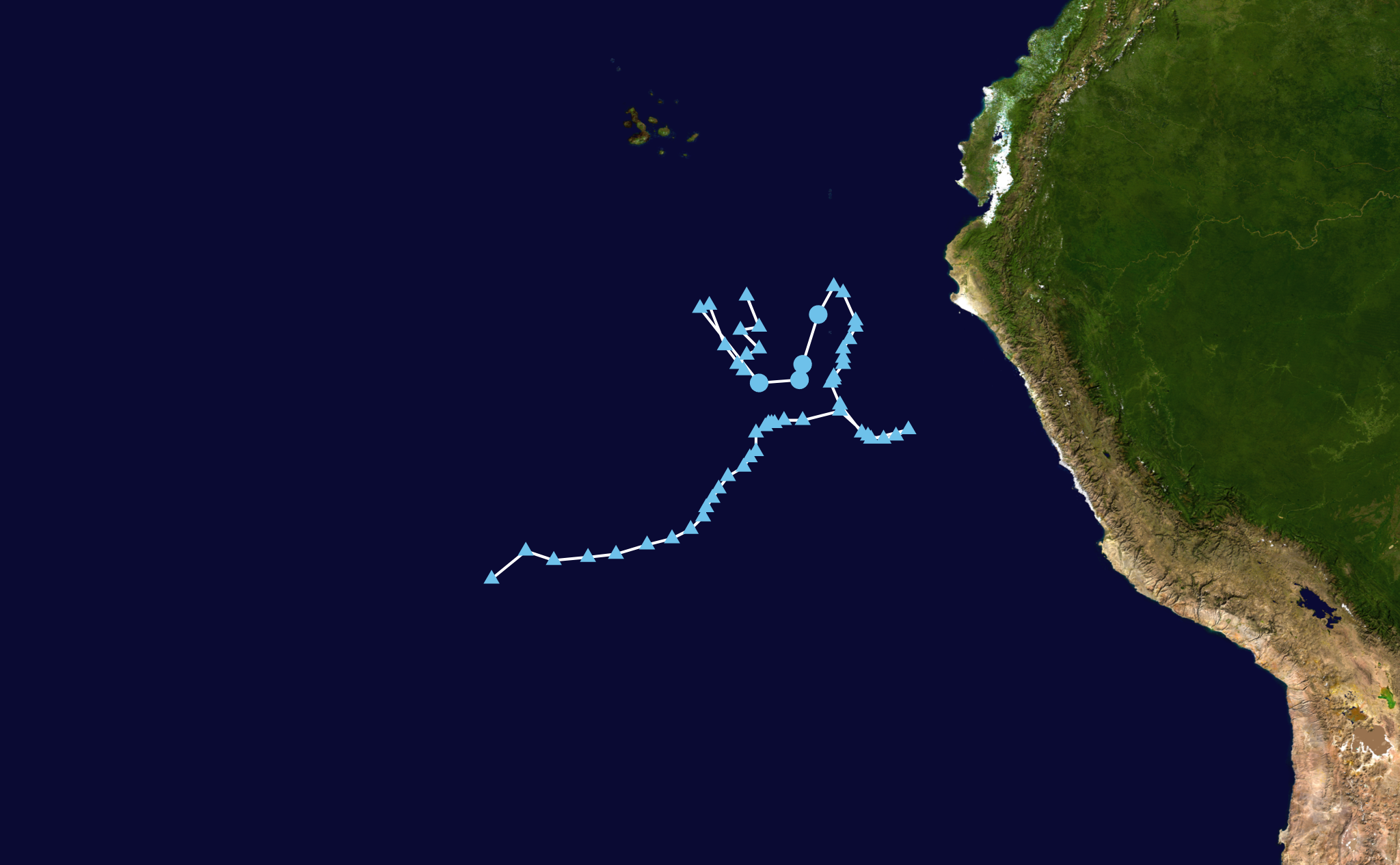
Map plotting the storm's track and intensity, according to the Saffir–Simpson scale Map key Saffir–Simpson scale Tropical depression (≤38 mph, ≤62 km/h) Tropical storm (39–73 mph, 63–118 km/h) Category 1 (74–95 mph, 119–153 km/h) Category 2 (96–110 mph, 154–177 km/h) Category 3 (111–129 mph, 178–208 km/h) Category 4 (130–156 mph, 209–251 km/h) Category 5 (≥157 mph, ≥252 km/h) Unknown Storm type Tropical cyclone Subtropical cyclone Extratropical cyclone, remnant low, tropical disturbance, or monsoon depression

On 7 March, SENAMHI reported an "unorganized tropical cyclone". SENAMHI researchers identified the formation of the cyclone in late February. Also they stated that the unusual phenomenon would remain in the Peruvian sea but would not affect any cities on the Peruvian and Ecuadorian coasts. They also reported that moderate to heavy rainfall would develop on Peru's northern coast and highlands from 9 to 11 March and that the cyclone would not become a hurricane. The system was named "Cyclone Yaku" by National Service of Meteorology and Hydrology of Peru, with the word "Yaku" coming from the Quechua translation of "water".

On 10 March, the National Institute of Meteorology and Hydrology (INAMHI) in Ecuador reported that Cyclone Yaku was moving away from Ecuador and no longer posed a direct threat to the country. In Peru, it was predicted that precipitation from the event would last through mid-March while precipitation from warm sea temperatures would occur into April. Yaku dissipated on 20 March.

According to Michael Linthon, the director of Oceanography and Marine Meteorology at the Instituto Oceanográfico de la Armada del Ecuador (INOCAR), the effects of climate change on oceans contributed towards the occurrence of Cyclone Yaku.

== Impact ==
Total damages from Yaku in Peru and Ecuador reached $690 million USD.

=== Peru ===
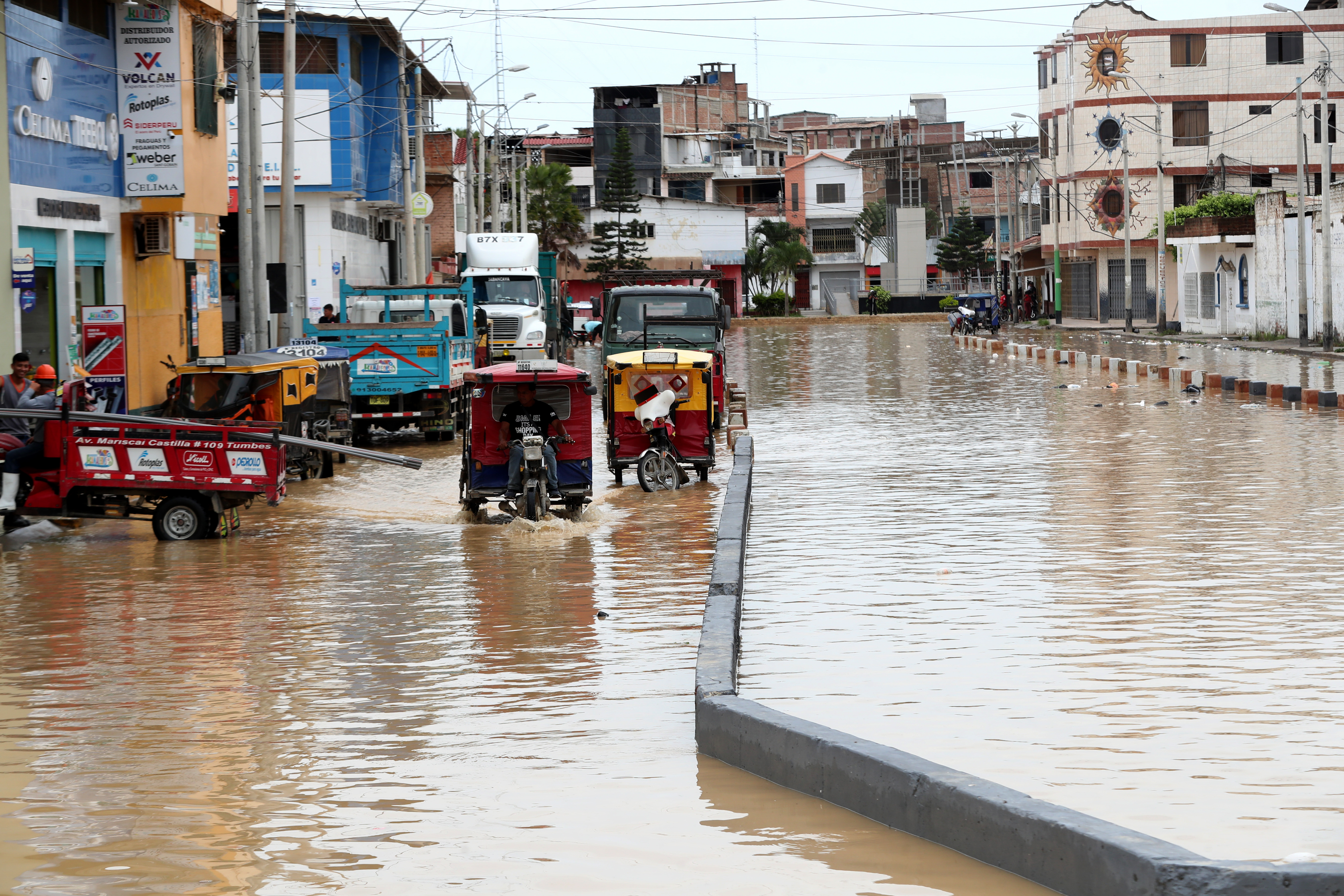
A flooded street in Tumbes, Peru

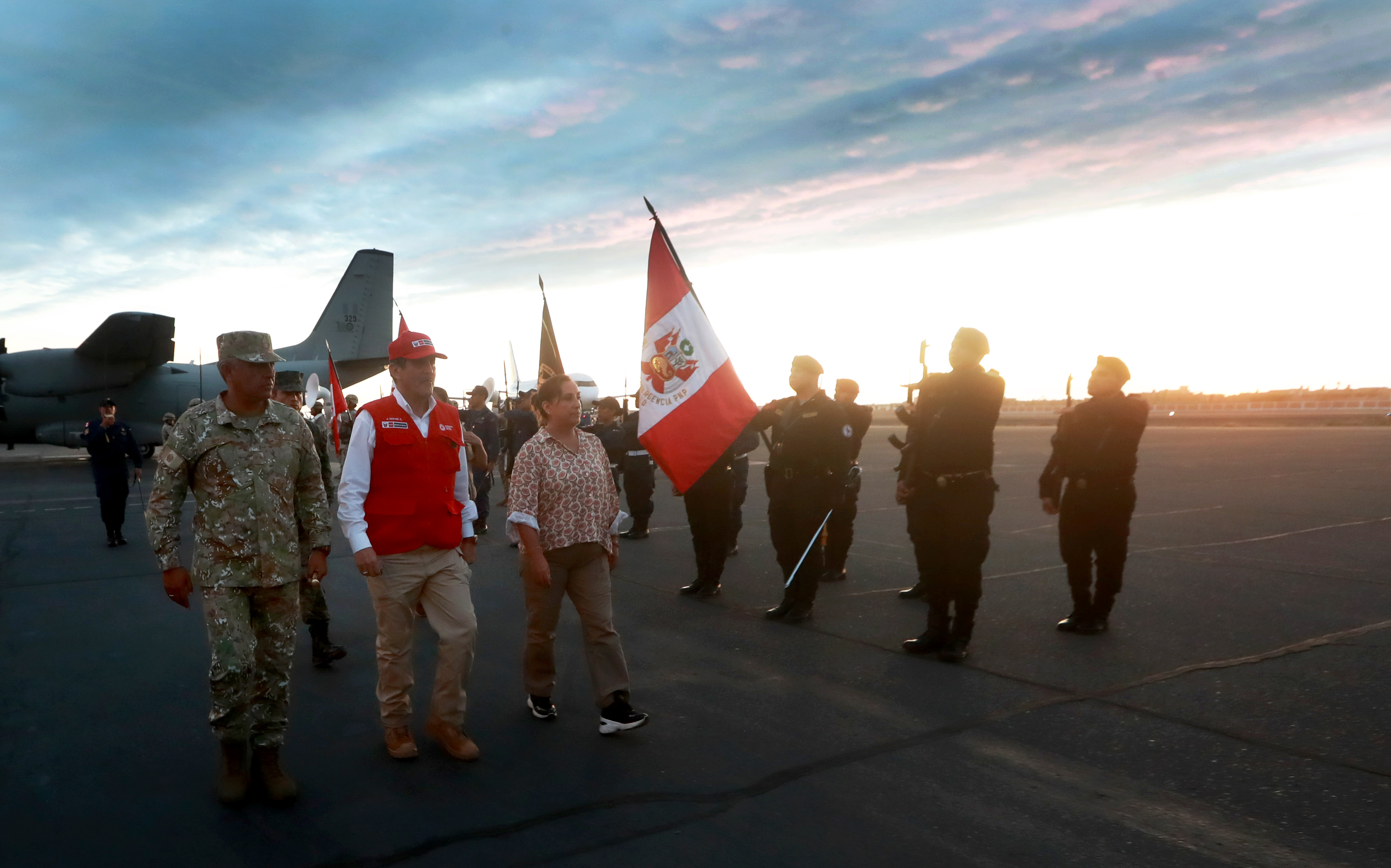
Dina Boluarte (President of Peru) accompanied by Jorge Chávez Cresta (Minister of Defense) arrive in La Libertad to inspect the damage caused by Cyclone Yaku.

Settlements along the desert coast of Peru often do not have drainage systems, and even small amounts of precipitation prove problematic for affected areas. Lima, Peru's capital city, is one of the most arid cities in the world, only receiving an average of 10 millimeters of precipitation annually. The cyclone happened during the widespread protests that had been occurring since the 2022 Peruvian political crisis.

Cyclone Yaku brought extreme rainfall conditions to the departments of Tumbes, Piura, and Lambayeque. On 8 March, rainfall was reported in the departments of Tumbes, Piura, Lambayeque, La Libertad, Ancash, and Lima. On 10 March, the La Leche River overflowed in Lambayeque Province, affecting the district of Illimo, leaving 3,000 homeless and leaving over 1,000 homes uninhabitable. In the department of La Libertad, there was flooding in the provinces of Chepén and Pacasmayo after torrential rains. SENAMHI reports indicated that the departments of Lambayeque and La Libertad exceeded the historical record of rainfall accumulation in 24 hours, reporting values not recorded since the 1997–98 and 2017 El Niño events.

By 14 March, dozens of huaicos were reported throughout the nation as a result of the rainfall. Huaicos were reported in the Lima Province, with mudslides reported in Ancón, Carabayllo, Chaclacayo, Cieneguilla, Comas and Punta Hermosa. In Punta Hermosa, widespread flooding was reported. The Piura River surpassed its crest in the urban area of Piura, resulting in flooding. The town of Quiruvilca was completely destroyed by landslides. Residents of Illimo, who faced flooding since 10 March, reported that despite much of the city being flooded, no response was provided and that they had not received drinking water for nearly five days. PerúSAT-1 collected images of Cyclone Yaku's impact in an effort to respond to the system's effect. In the early morning hours of 15 March, some residents of Lurigancho-Chosica were evacuated due to the risk of huaicos.

At least 60% of homes in Catacaos were abandoned due to the risks of the Piura River overflowing. CEPRENED estimated that 592 districts along Peru were at risk of landslides or mudslides due to heavy rains. Also, the National Institute of Civil Defence (INDECI) reported more than 45,000 people affected and 1,312 houses collapsed, with La Libertad being the most affected department. Regarding infrastructure and building losses, over 3,000 homes were left uninhabitable. The destruction included 58 schools, four medical facilities, over 60 kilometres (37 mi) of road, over 94 kilometres (58 mi) of irrigation canals and at least 118 bridges. President Dina Boluarte flew over the flooded areas after the heavy rains that affected in Lambayeque. The government of Dina Boluarte received criticism from international media and television celebrities, who claimed that its response to the natural disasters that hit the country was either slow or nonexistent.

=== Ecuador ===
Heavy rainfall occurred across at least 37 cantons in Ecuador. Milagro, and Yaguachi. El Triunfo experienced flooding, while the cyclone damaged residences in Quevedo and Los Ríos. Concerns of a leptospirosis outbreak followed 50 infections. Many areas in Guayaquil received heavy rainfall. Roads flooded as a result of these precipitations, and the electrical system was impacted.

== See also ==
- Weather of 2023
- Climate of Peru
- Climate of Ecuador
- Subtropical Cyclone Katie
- Subtropical Cyclone Lexi
- Subtropical Cyclone Humberto
- List of South America hurricanes
