= Hurricane Catarina =

Category 2 South Atlantic hurricane in 2004

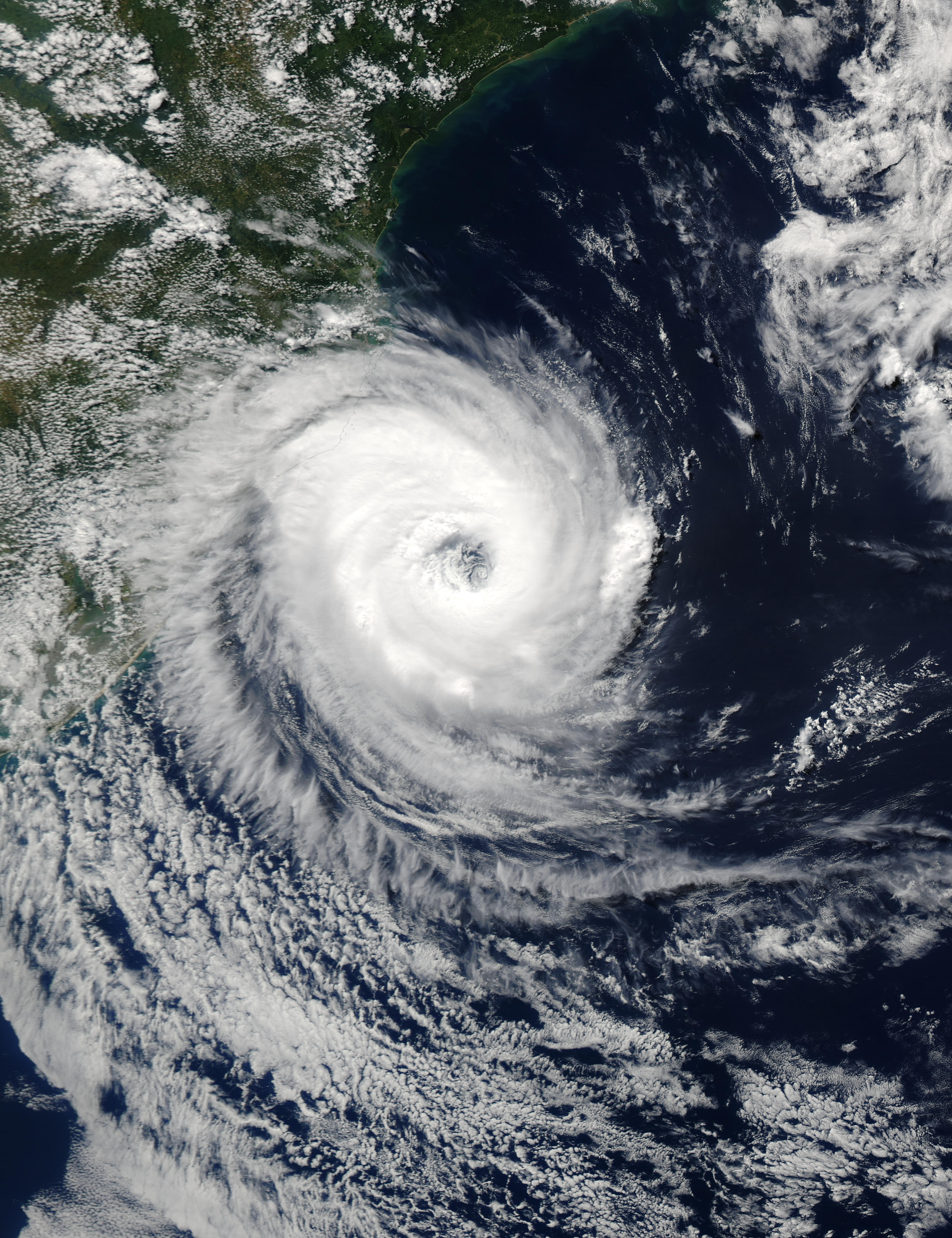
- Catarina approaching Brazil as a Category 1 hurricane on 27 March, shortly before its record peak intensity

Meteorological history
- Formed: 24 March 2004
- Dissipated: 28 March 2004

Category 2-equivalent tropical cyclone
- 1-minute sustained (SSHWS)
- Highest winds: 155 km/h (100 mph)
- Lowest pressure: 972 hPa (mbar); 28.70 inHg (Record low in the South Atlantic)

Overall effects
- Fatalities: 3–11 direct
- Damage: $350 million (2004 USD)
- Areas affected: Southern Brazil
- IBTrACS /
- Part of a series on South Atlantic tropical cyclones

Hurricane Catarina, or Cyclone Catarina (Portuguese pronunciation: [kataˈɾinɐ]) was the only recorded hurricane-strength South Atlantic tropical cyclone. Catarina made landfall in the South Region of Brazil at peak intensity as a Category 2-equivalent tropical cyclone on 28 March 2004.

The storm developed out of a stationary cold-core upper-level trough on 12 March. Almost a week later, on 19 March, a disturbance developed along the trough and traveled towards the west-southwest until 22 March when a ridge stopped the forward motion of the disturbance. The disturbance was in an unusually favorable environment with slightly below-average wind shear and above-average sea surface temperatures. The combination of the two led to a slow transition from an extratropical cyclone to a subtropical cyclone by 24 March. The storm continued to obtain tropical characteristics and became a tropical storm the next day while the winds steadily increased. The storm attained wind speeds of 121 km/h (75 mph)—equivalent to a low-end Category 1 hurricane on the Saffir–Simpson scale—on 26 March. At that time, it was unofficially named Catarina and was also the first hurricane-strength tropical cyclone ever recorded in the Southern Atlantic Ocean. Abnormally favorable conditions persisted, resulting in Catarina intensifying further, and it would peak with 1-minute sustained winds of 160 km/h (100 mph) on 28 March. The center of the storm made landfall between the cities of Passo de Torres and Balneário Gaivota, Santa Catarina soon after. Catarina rapidly weakened upon landfall and dissipated later that day.

Catarina was the first tropical cyclone to make landfall in Brazil since the beginning of reliable records; hence, the infrastructure and population were not specifically prepared for it, which led to severe damage. Although the storm was an unprecedented event, Brazilian officials took the appropriate actions and warned the public about the approaching storm. Residents heeded the warnings and prepared for the storm by either evacuating or by riding it out in their homes. Catarina ended up destroying 1,500 homes and damaging around 40,000 others. Agricultural products were severely damaged: 85% of the banana crops and 40% of the rice crops were lost in the storm. Three fatalities were caused by the storm and 185 more were injured. Catarina would cause around $350 million (2004 USD) in damages.

== Meteorological history ==
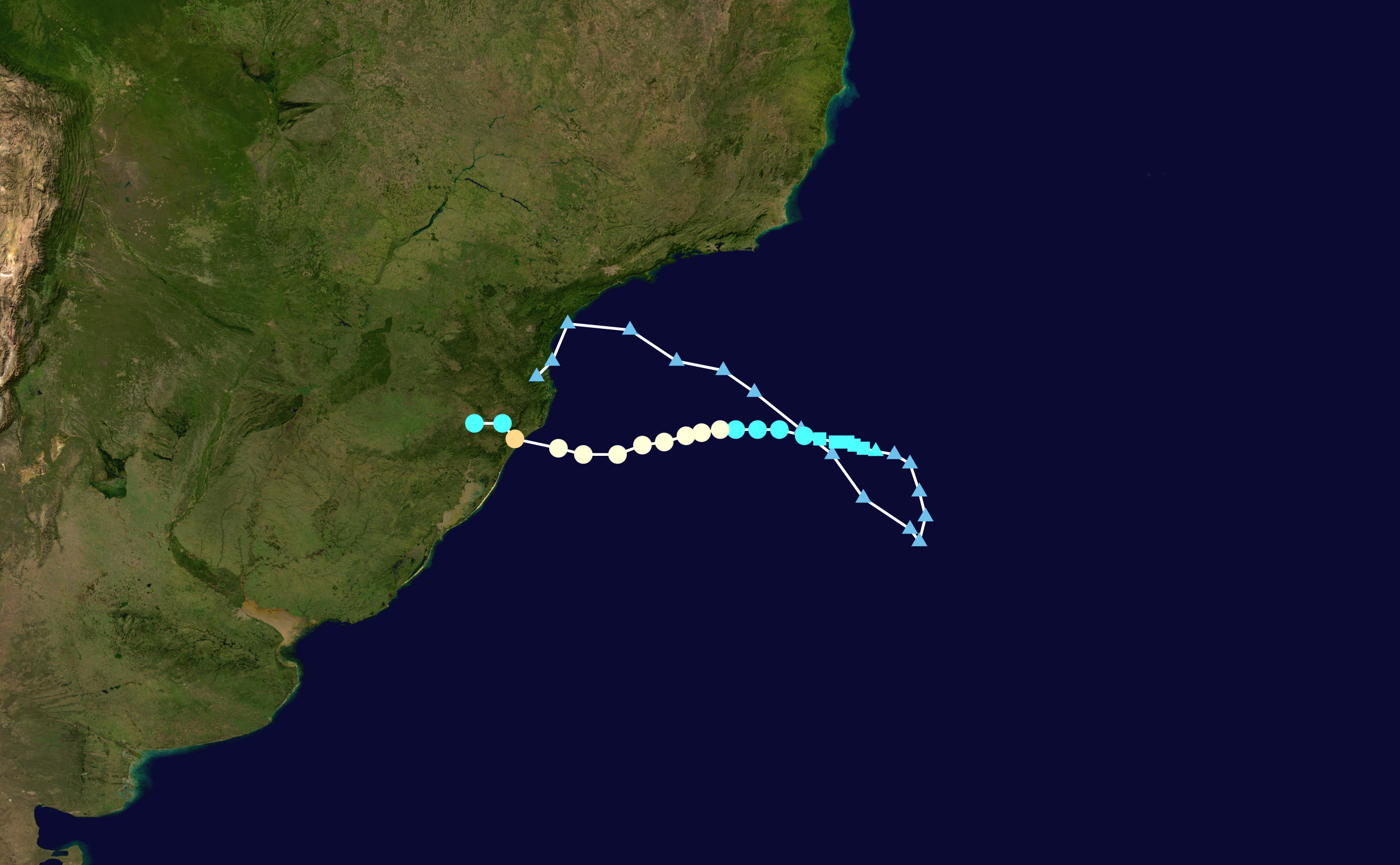
Map plotting the storm's track and intensity, according to the Saffir–Simpson scale Map key Saffir–Simpson scale Tropical depression (≤38 mph, ≤62 km/h) Tropical storm (39–73 mph, 63–118 km/h) Category 1 (74–95 mph, 119–153 km/h) Category 2 (96–110 mph, 154–177 km/h) Category 3 (111–129 mph, 178–208 km/h) Category 4 (130–156 mph, 209–251 km/h) Category 5 (≥157 mph, ≥252 km/h) Unknown Storm type Tropical cyclone Subtropical cyclone Extratropical cyclone, remnant low, tropical disturbance, or monsoon depression

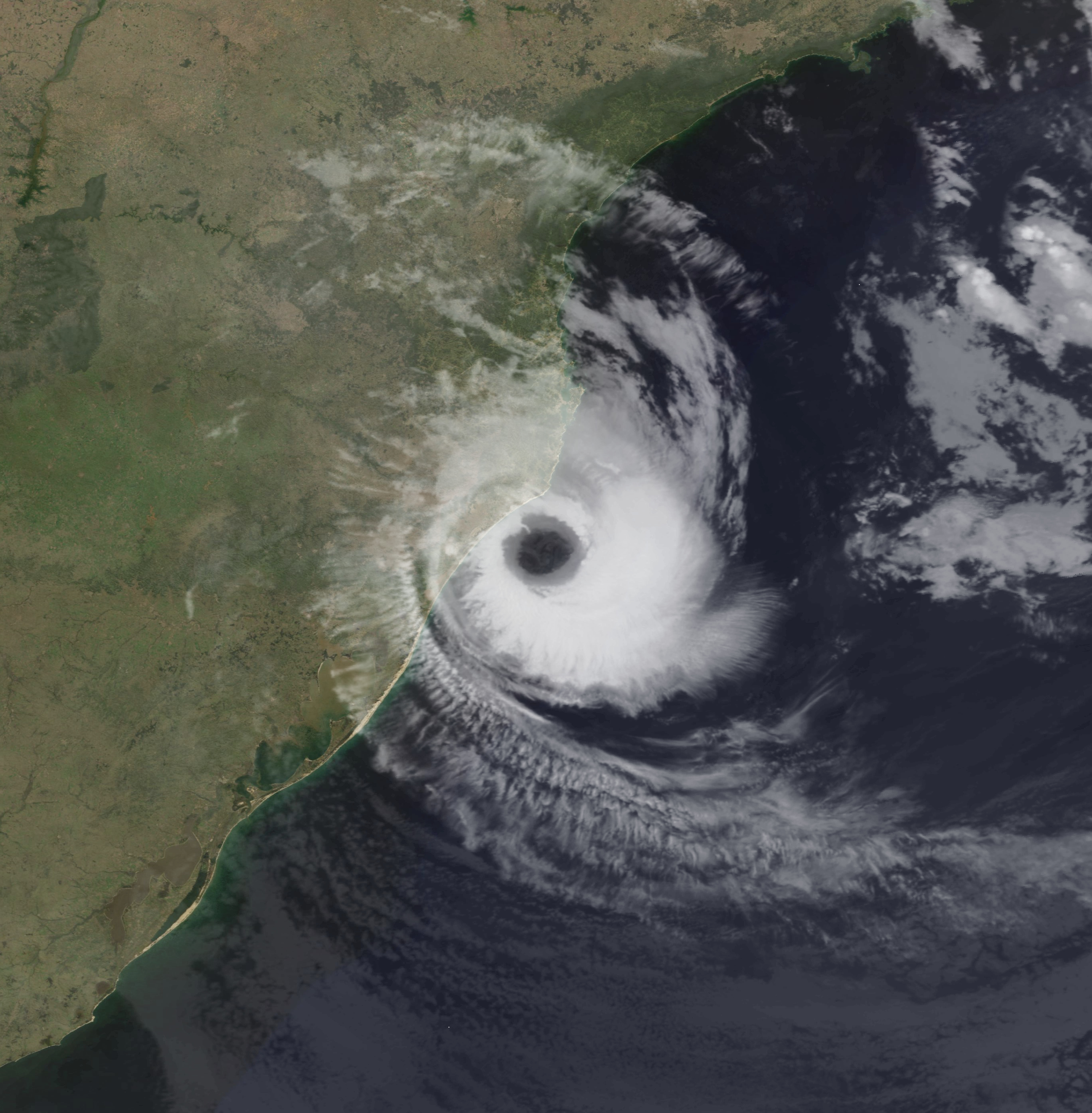
Hurricane Catarina as it made landfall in Brazil

On 12 March, a cold-core stationary upper-level trough became established offshore of southern Brazil. A disturbance formed within the trough on the 19 March, and moved east-southeastward until 22 March, when a ridge to its southeast kept it stationary. With exceptionally favorable upper-level winds and slightly below average wind shear, as well as marginally warm water temperatures from 24 to 26 °C (75 to 79 °F), it gradually developed tropical characteristics, resembling a subtropical storm by the 24 March. Located 630 nautical miles (1,165 km; 725 mi) east-southeast of Florianópolis, it headed slowly westward, and appeared to become a tropical storm on 25 March.

A compact storm, the cyclone continued westward while steadily intensifying. The structure of the storm continued to improve, and due to a definite eye feature showing on satellites, the storm was determined to have become a hurricane-equivalent cyclone on 26 March. The storm attained wind speeds of 121 km/h (75 mph)—equivalent to a low-end Category 1 hurricane on the Saffir–Simpson Hurricane wind scale (SSHWS)—on 26 March, making the cyclone the first hurricane-strength tropical cyclone ever recorded in the Southern Atlantic Ocean. Around this time, a Brazilian newspaper had a headline "Furacão Catarina" (i.e. "hurricane [threatening the state of Santa] Catarina"). Partially because of this headline, the storm was unofficially named Catarina. Unusually favorable conditions persisted and Catarina continued to intensify, and Catarina was estimated to have peaked with 1-minute sustained winds of 160 km/h (100 mph) on 28 March. Catarina continued to encounter favorable conditions and reached its peak intensity on early 28 March, with a minimum central pressure of 972 millibars (28.7 inHg) and estimated 1-minute sustained winds of 160 km/h (100 mph), which made the storm the equivalent of a Category 2 hurricane on the Saffir–Simpson scale. Wind gusts peaked at around 190 km/h (120 mph). Soon afterward, the hurricane made landfall on the southern coast of Santa Catarina and northeastern Rio Grande do Sul, with winds up to 195 km/h (121 mph) overnight. After making landfall, Catarina rapidly weakened over land, in the normal manner of a tropical cyclone, dissipating later that day.

== Naming ==
Brazilian meteorologists named the storm Catarina for its proximity to (and eventual landfall near) the state of Santa Catarina, although government forecasters initially denied that the storm, which clearly had an open eye and various other tropical morphologies, was a hurricane at all.

After some debate, Brazilian meteorologists concluded that Catarina was a hurricane during the storm's final phase, "Confirmed: the cyclone Catarina was considered a hurricane in its final phase. During the classification debate, it was concluded that Catarina formed as a cyclone in the subtropical latitudes of the South Atlantic and when it moved towards the continent, the cyclone Catarina acquired the characteristics of a hurricane. The final workshop recommendation is: if other cyclones of such intensity affect the Brazilian coast in future, they will have to be called hurricanes in order to distinguish them from less severe cyclonic storms."

North American forecasters considered this storm a hurricane immediately upon reviewing the satellite-derived evidence. Since Catarina had a clear eyewall structure bounded by deep convective, dense central overcast, well-defined spiral outer bands and outflow structure, warm water temperatures of 26 °C (79 °F), little shear, a warm core low, overall tropical characteristics, and occurred in March (equivalent to September in the Northern Hemisphere, the peak of hurricane season), it was considered to be a hurricane by the National Hurricane Center (NHC) in the United States.

Though it is most commonly known as Catarina, all names for this storm are unofficial, as it was not named by any hurricane-monitoring meteorological agency affiliated with the World Meteorological Organization (WMO). (Tropical cyclone names are predetermined by an international committee of the WMO.) It has also been unofficially called "Aldonça", and the advisory names for it were "01T-ALPHA" from the United Kingdom's Met Office, and "50L-NONAME" from the United States' National Hurricane Center, which keeps it well outside normal designation, which start at 01L for designated storms and use 90L to 99L for invests.

== Rare formation ==
Typically, tropical cyclones do not form in the South Atlantic Ocean, due to strong upper-level shear, cool water temperatures, and the lack of a convergence zone of convection. Occasionally though, as seen in 1991 and early 2004, conditions can become slightly more favorable. For Catarina, it was a combination of climatic and atmospheric anomalies. Water temperatures on Catarina's path ranged from 24 to 25 °C (75 to 77 °F), slightly less than the 26.5 °C (79.7 °F) temperature of a normal tropical cyclone, but sufficient for a storm of baroclinic origin.

Catarina remains the only hurricane strength tropical cyclone ever observed in the South Atlantic Ocean (reliable continuous and relatively comprehensive records only began with the satellite era beginning about 1970). Other systems have been observed in this region; however, none have reached hurricane strength. While Catarina formed in an unusual area, its relation to global warming or any other type of global climatic change is still up for debate. The Brazilian Society of Meteorology attributed it to "climatic changes and atmospheric anomalies", while other researchers have indicated that it could be the result of the Southern Annular Mode or other seasonal variations in weather within the Southern Hemisphere, again linked to global changes in climate. However, more research in the area is still needed to make a conclusion.

== Impact ==
Like other tropical cyclones, Catarina brought heavy flooding with it. Despite the uncertainty in the future of the storm, Brazilian officials took the appropriate actions to ensure the safety of the residents who lived along the coastline. A successful evacuation was executed for numerous residents along the coast, though some people decided to ride out the storm in their own homes. The storm damaged around 40,000 homes and destroyed 1,500; 40% of the rice crop were also lost. Total damages were estimated at $350 million (2004 USD). It also killed at least three and injured at least 75. At least 2,000 people were left homeless following the storm.

At Passo de Torres, many shipyards were destroyed, as they were not designed to withstand the pressure differentials caused by Catarina's winds; widespread roof damage was reported at this municipality as well. Near the Mampituba River, a house was blown about 50 m (160 ft) upstream, literally landing in another state: it originally was built in the Torres municipality of Rio Grande do Sul, yet it ended up in Passo de Torres, within Santa Catarina. In rural areas, the corn, banana, and rice fields received the most damage, although rice farmers were able to partially recoup their losses, as they had harvested before Catarina made landfall.

Overall, almost 36,000 residences were damaged as a result of Catarina's onslaught; of those, 993 collapsed completely. The commercial sector fared slightly better, as only 2,274 buildings were damaged and 472 collapsed. Finally, 397 public buildings were damaged and three were destroyed. These account for 26% of the total buildings in the region, which amounted to property damage of US$25.6 million (value in 2004). Four-fifths of the damaged houses had some sort of roof failure or collapse. Most of the damage was blamed on the low quality of the construction; brick residences typically lacked plaster, beams, or columns, for example. The areas affected the most were those inhabited by low-income families, usually with annual family incomes of less than US$400.

Many studies were published out to measure Complex post-traumatic stress disorder, its symptoms and depression, focusing on cognition and biological indicators. As of 2013, there were no before-and-after studies of the 2004 Hurricane. The impact on children is considered particularly difficult to analyze because random assignments and double-blind procedures may not be possible or ethical for them, and therefore studies are usually limited to testing causal hypotheses. A 2021 study found that the hurricane adversely affected children in utero, leading to reduced birth weight and increases in fetal deaths, possibly due to maternal stress.

== See also ==
- Subtropical Storm Arani (2011) – The first system officially named by the Brazilian Navy
- Cyclone Ianos (2020) – The strongest tropical cyclone to ever occur in the Mediterranean Sea, another unusual area of tropical cyclone formation
- Mediterranean tropical-like cyclones
- Unusual areas of tropical cyclone formation
- 2006 Central Pacific cyclone
- 2005 storm in Uruguay
- 1996 Lake Huron cyclone
- Subtropical Cyclone Katie
- Subtropical Cyclone Lexi
- Cyclone Yaku
