= 1933 Trinidad hurricane =

Category 2 Atlantic hurricane in 1933

Hurricane Two 1933 Trinidad hurricane
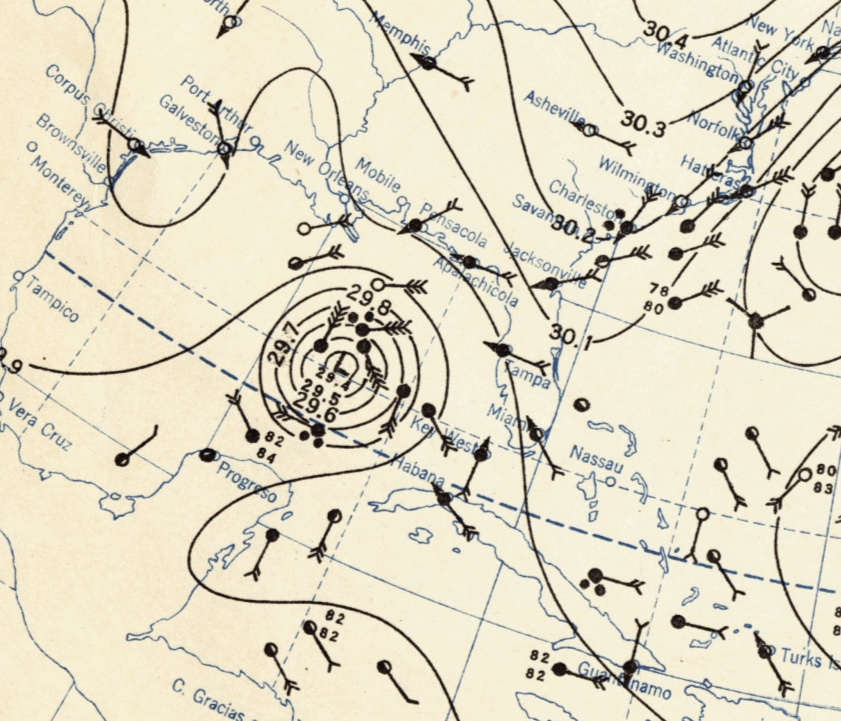
- Surface weather analysis showing the hurricane over the Gulf of Mexico on July 4

Meteorological history
- Formed: June 24, 1933
- Dissipated: July 8, 1933

Category 2 hurricane
- 1-minute sustained (SSHWS/NWS)
- Highest winds: 110 mph (175 km/h)
- Lowest pressure: 965 mbar (hPa); 28.50 inHg

Overall effects
- Fatalities: 35 total
- Damage: $7.2 million (1933 USD)
- Areas affected: Leeward Islands (Trinidad landfall), Venezuela, Cuba, Mexico
- IBTrACS
- Part of the 1933 Atlantic hurricane season

The 1933 Trinidad hurricane was a deadly and destructive tropical cyclone, one of only three Atlantic hurricanes on record to produce hurricane-force winds in Venezuela. The second tropical storm and first hurricane of the extremely active 1933 Atlantic hurricane season, the system formed on June 24 to the east of the Lesser Antilles, unusually early for the Main Development Region (MDR) so early in the calendar year. It moved westward and attained hurricane status before striking Trinidad on June 27. The storm caused heavy damage on the island, estimated at $3 million. (Note: All damage totals are in 1933 United states dollars.) The strong winds downed trees and destroyed hundreds of houses, leaving about 1,000 people homeless. Later, the hurricane crossed the northeastern portion of Venezuela, where power outages and damaged houses were reported.

After entering the Caribbean Sea, the hurricane maintained a northwest trajectory. It passed south of Jamaica on July 1, where heavy rainfall flooded roads and railways. The hurricane crossed western Cuba on July 3. High winds on the island destroyed hundreds of houses, and the storm's rainfall damaged the tobacco crop. Upon entering the Gulf of Mexico, the hurricane turned to the west and attained peak winds of 110 mph (180 km/h) on July 5. It struck northeastern Mexico on July 8 and quickly dissipated. Upon its final landfall, the storm caused heavy damage in Mexico, and in southern Texas, the storm ended a prolonged drought.

== Meteorological history ==
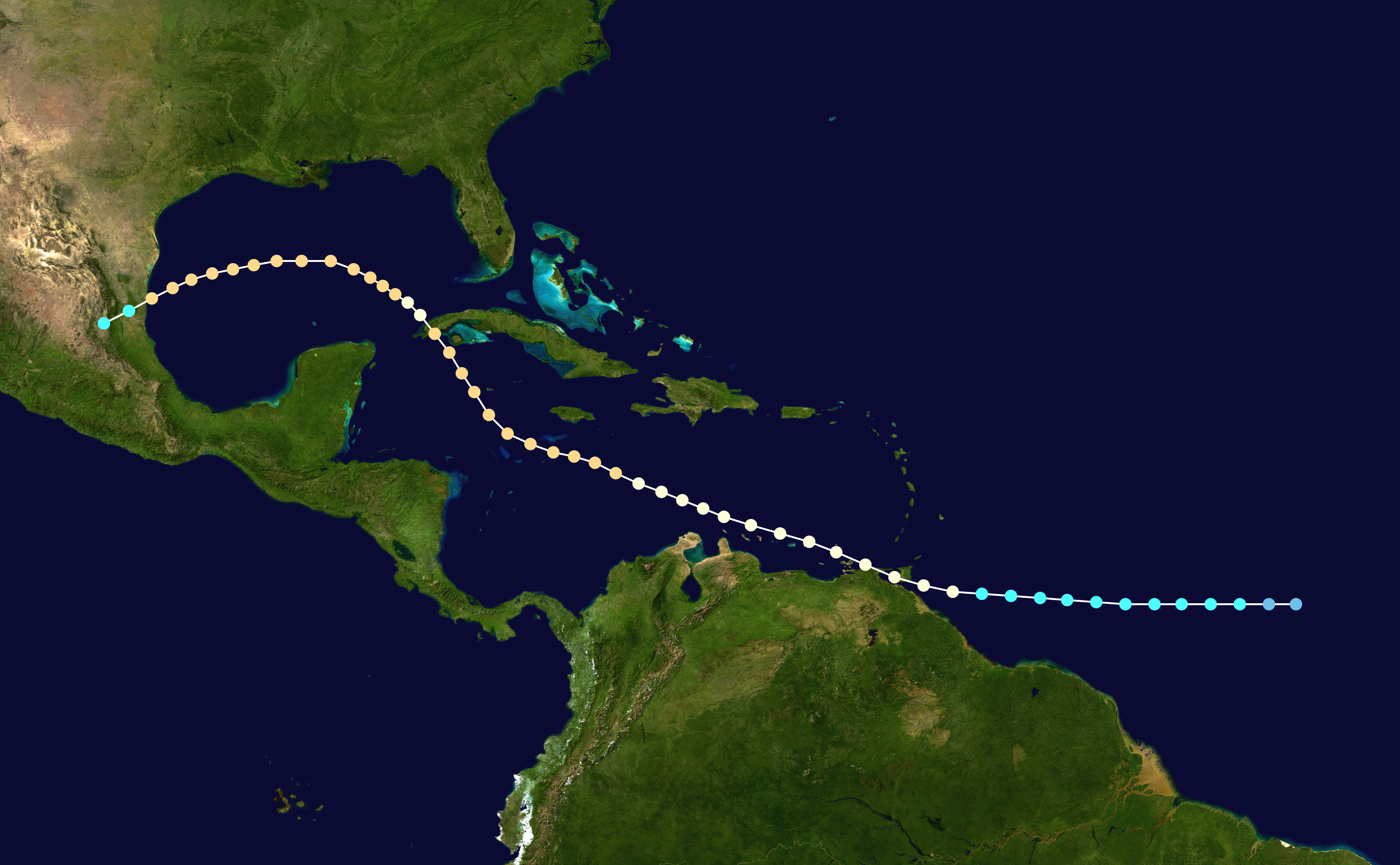
Map plotting the storm's track and intensity, according to the Saffir–Simpson scale Map key Saffir–Simpson scale Tropical depression (≤38 mph, ≤62 km/h) Tropical storm (39–73 mph, 63–118 km/h) Category 1 (74–95 mph, 119–153 km/h) Category 2 (96–110 mph, 154–177 km/h) Category 3 (111–129 mph, 178–208 km/h) Category 4 (130–156 mph, 209–251 km/h) Category 5 (≥157 mph, ≥252 km/h) Unknown Storm type Tropical cyclone Subtropical cyclone Extratropical cyclone, remnant low, tropical disturbance, or monsoon depression

A tropical wave was first observed near 40° W on June 23. The next day, a ship in the region observed a closed circulation, suggesting that the tropical wave spawned a tropical depression about 1,300 mi (2,100 km) east of Trinidad. The storm moved westward and gradually intensified into a tropical storm. By June 27, it attained hurricane strength about 175 mi (282 km) east of Trinidad, based on a ship report of a barometric pressure of 991 mbar (29.27 inHg). At around 21:00 UTC on June 27, the hurricane made landfall on extreme southern Trinidad with winds of about 85 mph (137 km/h). (Note: The Atlantic hurricane reanalysis discovered in 2012 that the hurricane made landfall on Trinidad instead of passing south of the island.) After crossing the island, the hurricane struck the Paria Peninsula of northern Venezuela at the same intensity at 02:00 UTC on June 28.

About two hours after striking Venezuela, the hurricane entered the southeastern Caribbean Sea. For the next few days it maintained its intensity while tracking to the northwest. A ship on June 30 reported a pressure of 982 mb (29.0 inHg), suggesting winds of about 100 mph (160 km/h). The next day, the hurricane passed south of Jamaica and turned more to the west before resuming a northwest motion. At around 06:00 UTC on July 3, the hurricane made landfall on western Cuba with winds of 100 mph (160 km/h). It weakened while crossing the island, although it maintained hurricane status upon entering the Gulf of Mexico. On July 4, a strong high pressure area over the eastern United States turned the hurricane to the west. After restrengthening, the storm attained peak winds of 110 mph (180 km/h) on July 5, based on a ship report of a pressure of 965 mbar (28.5 inHg). It maintained that intensity for about 18 hours, and during that time the hurricane turned to the southwest. At 01:00 UTC on July 8, the hurricane made its final landfall near La Pesca, about halfway between Tampico, Tamaulipas and Brownsville, Texas. The intensity at landfall was estimated at 85 mph (137 km/h). After moving ashore, the hurricane rapidly weakened over the high terrain of northeastern Mexico, and the storm dissipated at around 12:00 UTC on July 8.

== Impact ==
Throughout its path, the hurricane killed at least 35 people altogether in Trinidad, Venezuela, Jamaica, and Cuba. The hurricane first affected Trinidad, causing about $3 million in damage in the southern portion of the island. The storm destroyed 300 houses in one village, and thousands were left homeless. Trees across the island fell down and blocked many roads, including one that struck a car and seriously injured one man. Heavy damage was also reported to the cocoa industry. High winds destroyed about 60 oil derricks, and an 11 mi (18 km) oil supply line was disrupted due to fallen trees. This represented a significant loss to the island's oil industry, one of two such events in the 1930s. High winds downed power lines across the island, which were repaired by three days after the storm struck. The storm also dropped heavy rainfall and destroyed the roofs of many houses. Little damage occurred in the capital city of Port of Spain. There were 13 deaths in Trinidad, some of whom drowned after their boats sank. After the storm, medical assistance and relief supplies were sent via boat to Cedros, which was one of the most significantly affected areas.

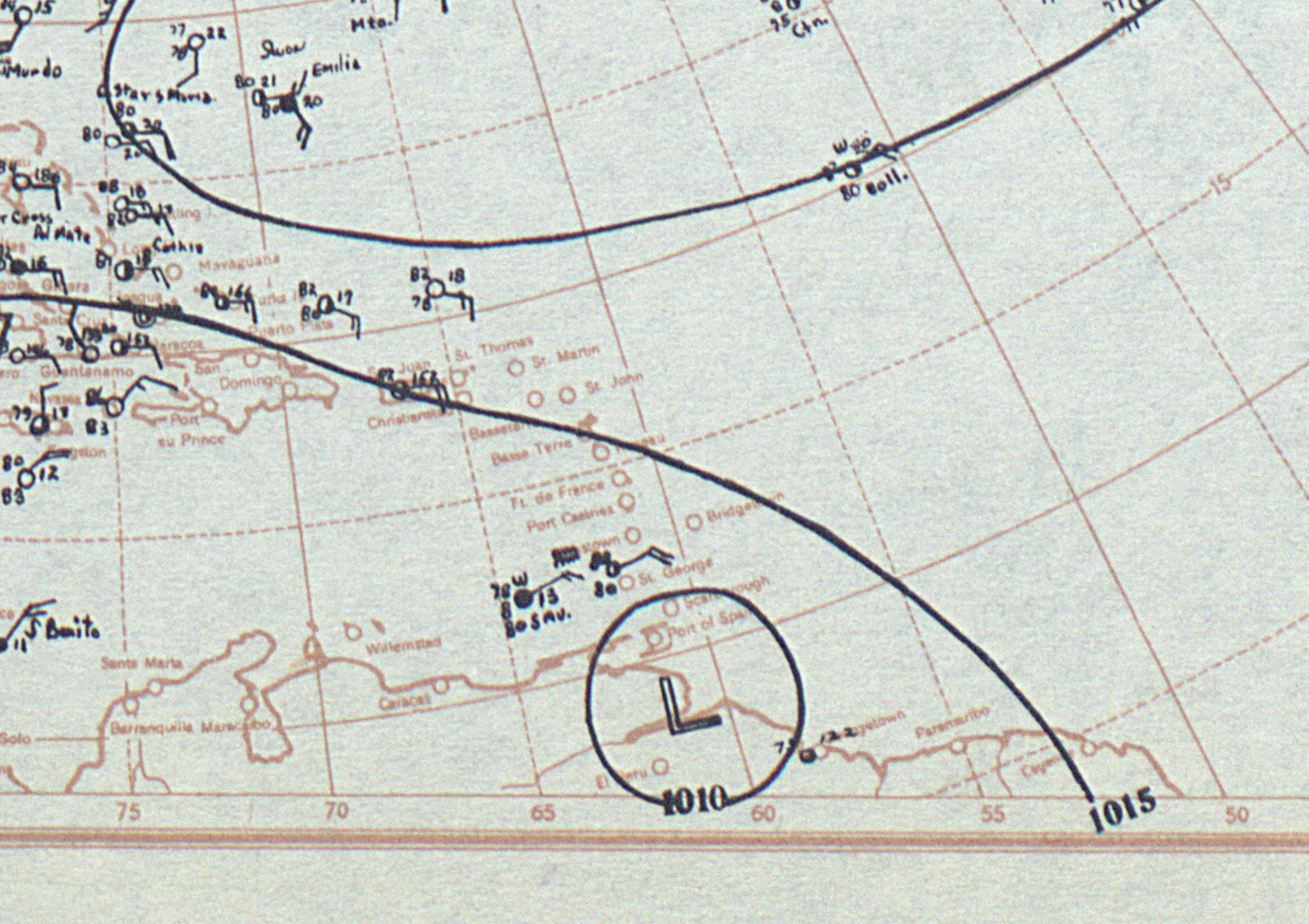
Weather map of the hurricane at landfall in Trinidad on June 27

After affecting Trinidad, the hurricane struck northeastern Venezuela, where damage was heaviest in Carúpano, Río Caribe, and Isla Margarita. High winds cut telephone and telegraph lines for several days. The storm destroyed several houses and fishing boats, resulting in several million bolívares in damage. (Note: In 1933, one Venezuelan bolívar is 19.3 cents. 1 million bolívares would be $193,000.) Officials reported that there were "a number of lives lost" due to the hurricane. Striking with winds of 85 mph (137 km/h), the storm was one of only three Atlantic tropical cyclones on record at the time to affect the country with hurricane-force winds, after hurricanes in 1877 and 1892.

After moving across the Caribbean, the hurricane affected Jamaica. High winds downed about 200,000 banana trees, while flooding in the western portion of the island affected roads and railways. Later, the hurricane crossed western Cuba, killing 22 people and causing $4 million in damage. The hurricane destroyed about 100 houses in Pinar del Río Province from the combination of strong winds and flooding from heavy rainfall. One person died after her house collapsed in the province. The rainfall caused four rivers to exceed their banks, and the storm-related flooding left serious damage to the tobacco industry. The storm also damaged crops in the region. High winds downed telephone and telegraph lines in western Cuba. Little damage was reported in the capital city of Havana, despite the report of a peak wind gust of 70 mph (110 km/h). After the storm, Cuban President Gerardo Machado utilized the military to assist in relief operations and prevent looting.

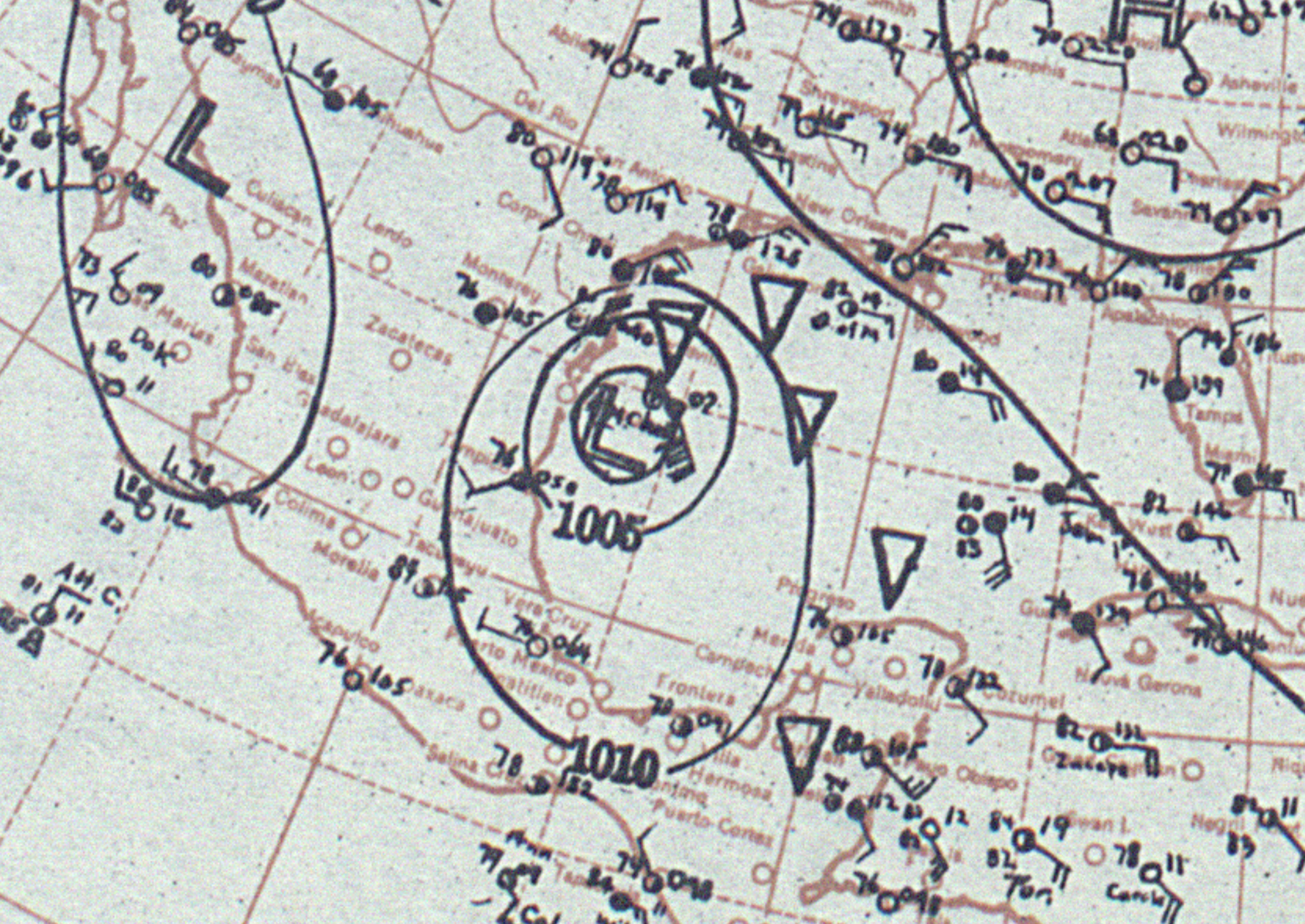
Synoptic weather map of the hurricane nearing landfall in Mexico on July 6

The threat of the storm prompted the United States Weather Bureau to issue southeast storm warnings for Key West, Florida. Light rainfall from the storm was reported in Miami. Before the storm made its final landfall, the Weather Bureau issued northeast storm warnings from Brownsville to Port O'Connor, Texas on July 5. That same day, a hurricane warning was also issued for Brownsville. The hurricane ultimately struck a sparsely populated area of northeastern Mexico, causing heavy damage in the country. The hurricane killed three people in Tamaulipas. High winds downed trees and power lines, and damaged the roofs of several houses. Along the beach near Tampico, high tides damaged coastal structures and flooded some cars. The effects extended into Texas, and Brazos Island, Port Isabel, and Port Aransas were flooded due to the storm surge. High tides damaged ten piers in Port Isabel, and there was damage to buildings along the coast. The storm damaged the cotton and fruit crops in south Texas from high winds and rainfall. Rains from the storm ended an extended drought in the Brownsville area.

== Records ==
The 1933 Monthly Weather Review summary of the season noted that the hurricane was the "earliest known in [the] general area also the only one in a record of nearly 50 years to pass south of the Island of Trinidad and over the northeast corner of Venezuela." It became a tropical storm farther east in the MDR at an earlier date than any prior system on record in the calendar year; this distinction was later surpassed by Tropical Storm Bret in 2023. It was also the easternmost Atlantic hurricane in June until Hurricane Beryl in 2024.

== See also ==
- List of South America tropical cyclones
- Hurricane Ivan (2004) – The southernmost major hurricane in the Atlantic basin on record
- Hurricane Emily (2005) – An unusually strong July hurricane that developed in the deep tropics
- Tropical Storm Bret (2017) – Earliest tropical storm to form in the Main Development Region (MDR) on record
- Hurricane Beryl (2018) – A compact hurricane that developed between the Lesser Antilles and Africa in July
- Hurricane Elsa (2021) – Also developed in the eastern Main Development Region in June
- Hurricane Beryl (2024) – A deadly and destructive tropical cyclone that also developed in the eastern Main Development Region in June
