= July 2016 North China cyclone =

2016 Extratropical cyclone in China

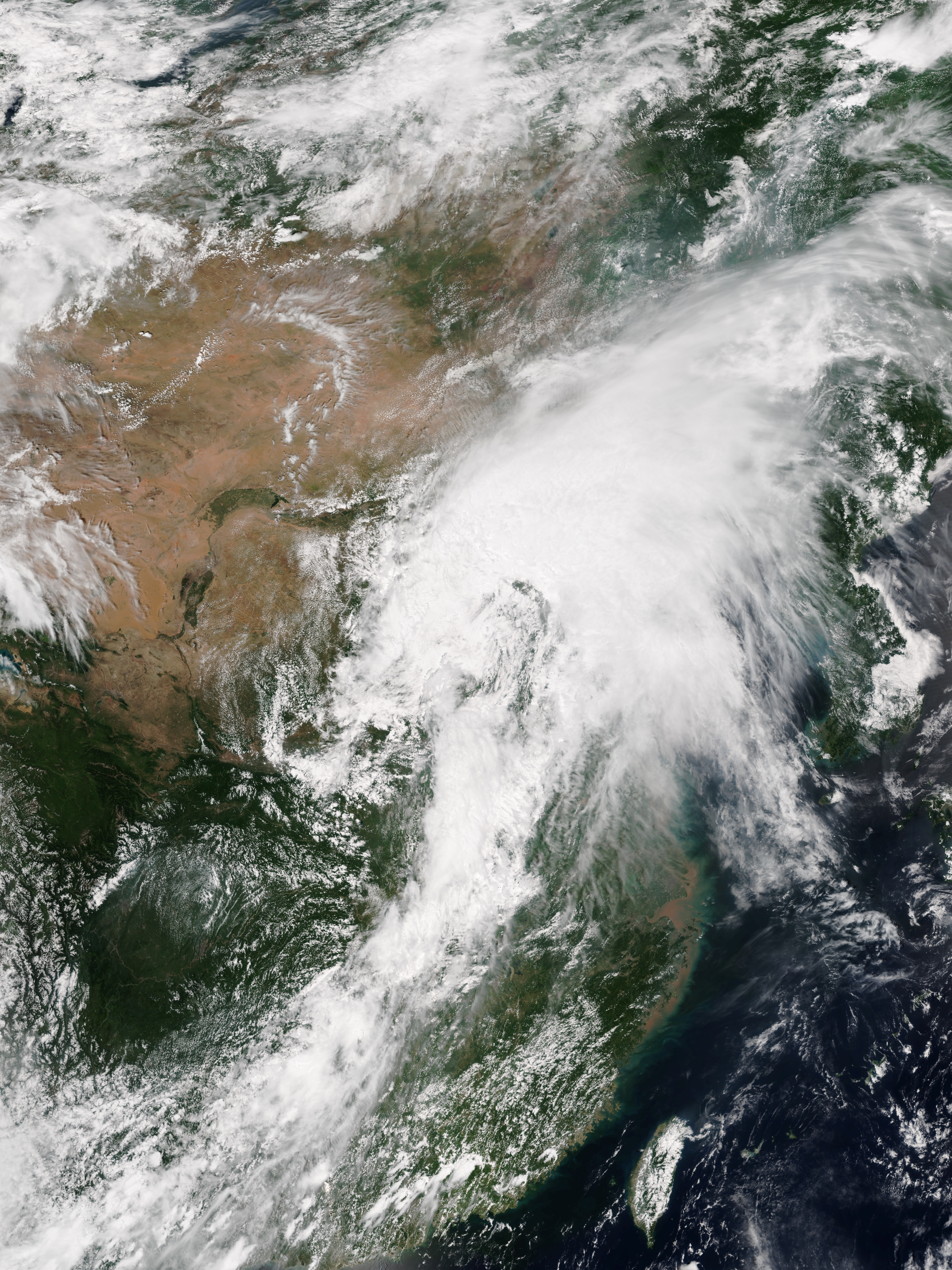
- The extratropical cyclone at peak intensity over North China on July 20, 2016

Meteorological history
- Formed: July 16, 2016
- Dissipated: July 21, 2016

Extratropical cyclone
- Lowest pressure: 994 hPa (mbar); 29.35 inHg
- Maximum rainfall: 881 mm (34.69 in)

Overall effects
- Fatalities: 184
- Missing: 130
- Damage: $4.96 billion (2016 USD)(Preliminary total)
- Areas affected: Central, North, Northeast and Southwest China

The July 2016 North China cyclone was a devastating extratropical cyclone which produced torrential precipitation and caused widespread flash floods over North China and portions of nearby regions, resulting in at least 184 deaths and ¥33.19 billion (US$4.96 billion) of damage in China.

== Meteorological history ==
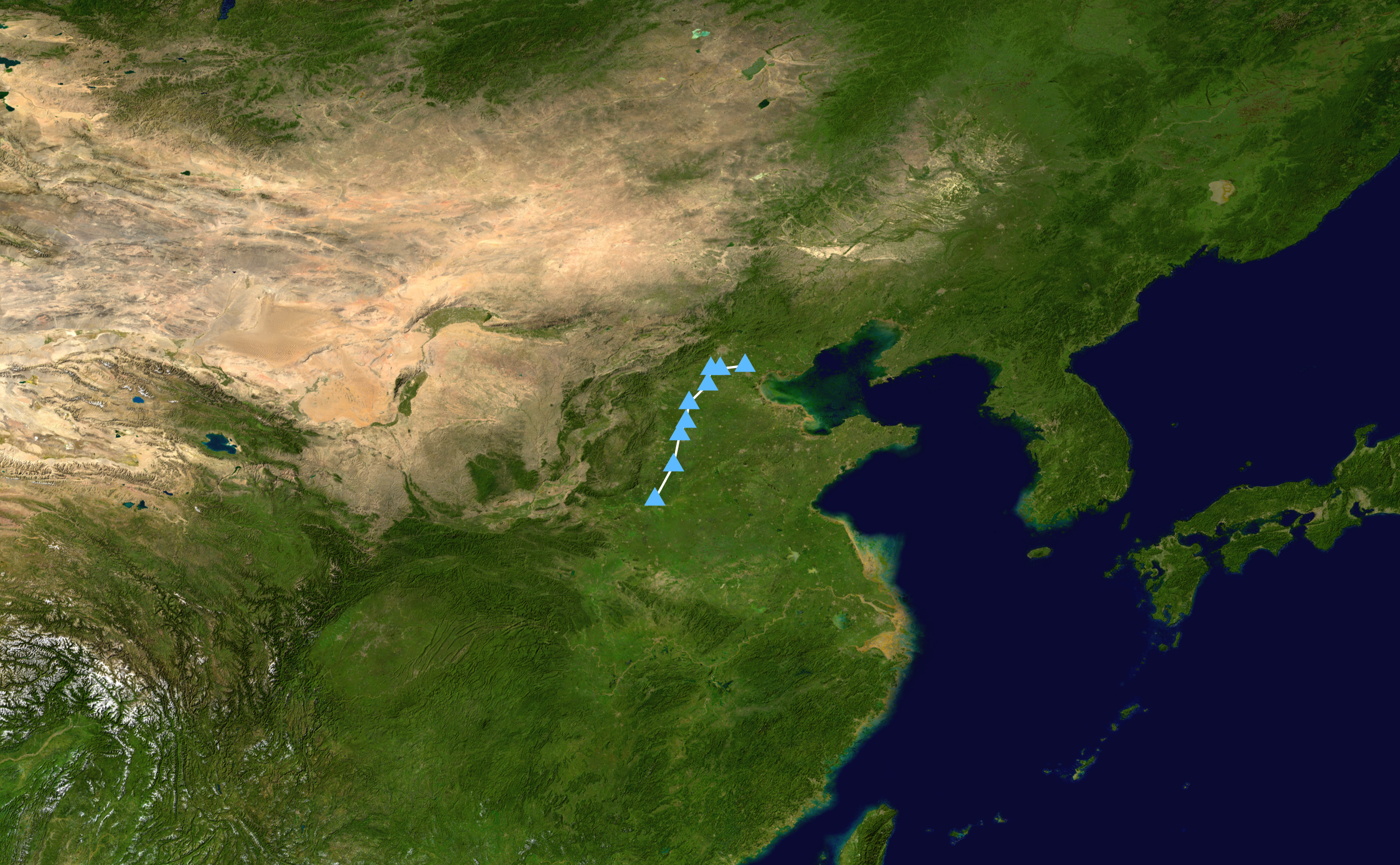
Map plotting the storm's track and intensity, according to the Saffir–Simpson scale Map key Saffir–Simpson scale Tropical depression (≤38 mph, ≤62 km/h) Tropical storm (39–73 mph, 63–118 km/h) Category 1 (74–95 mph, 119–153 km/h) Category 2 (96–110 mph, 154–177 km/h) Category 3 (111–129 mph, 178–208 km/h) Category 4 (130–156 mph, 209–251 km/h) Category 5 (≥157 mph, ≥252 km/h) Unknown Storm type Tropical cyclone Subtropical cyclone Extratropical cyclone, remnant low, tropical disturbance, or monsoon depression

The meiyu front persisted over the region between Huai River and Yangtze during mid-July 2016 since the dissipation of Typhoon Nepartak. Meanwhile, the subtropical ridge over the northwest Pacific Ocean was located unusually southward and westward, which blocked the Southwest Monsoon and made it completely flow into mainland China. On July 19, as the westerlies collided with the strong Southwest Monsoon, cyclogenesis began within the front and formed an extratropical cyclone over Henan, China at around 20:00 CST (12:00 UTC). The cyclone quickly reached peak intensity at around 02:00 CST (18:00 UTC) on July 20, with the central pressure at 994 hPa (29.35 inHg). Drifting north-northeastward with surface sustained winds below gale-force, the system started to weaken slowly in the province of Hebei after 14:00 CST (06:00 UTC) and occluded right before 02:00 CST (18:00 UTC) on July 21, owing to the disconnection from the Southwest Monsoon. It became almost stationary near Beijing until it dissipated after 20:00 CST (12:00 UTC) on July 21.

== Impact ==
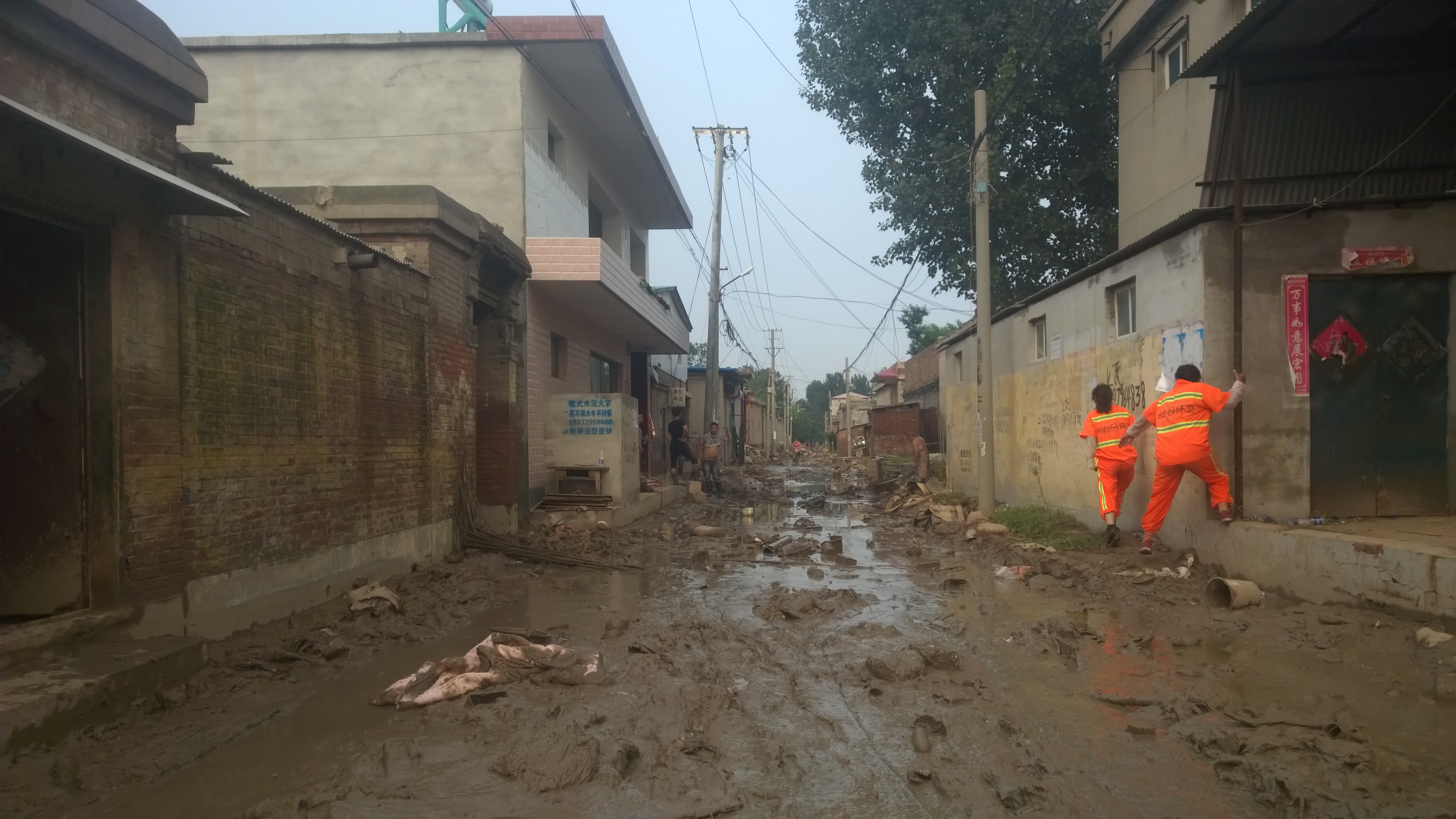
A muddy village in Xingtai

Throughout the municipalities of Beijing, Chongqing and Tianjin as well as the provinces of Guizhou, Hebei, Heilongjiang, Henan, Inner Mongolia, Jilin, Liaoning, Shandong, Shanxi, Sichuan and Yunnan, the extratropical cyclone brought torrential rainfalls and caused severe flash floods, which affected 15,597,000 people, with 184 deaths, 130 missing and ¥33.19 billion (US$4.96 billion) of damage. 575,000 people were evacuated, and 155,000 people need an emergency relief. More than 129,500 houses are collapsed, and at least 361,000 houses are damaged. The damaged agricultural areas are 12,049 km^{2}, including 807 km^{2} (312 sq mi) of the destroyed agricultural areas.

== See also ==
- 2016 China floods
- East Asian rainy season
- Typhoon Nepartak (2016)
