= Miller classification =

Classification system for Nor'easters

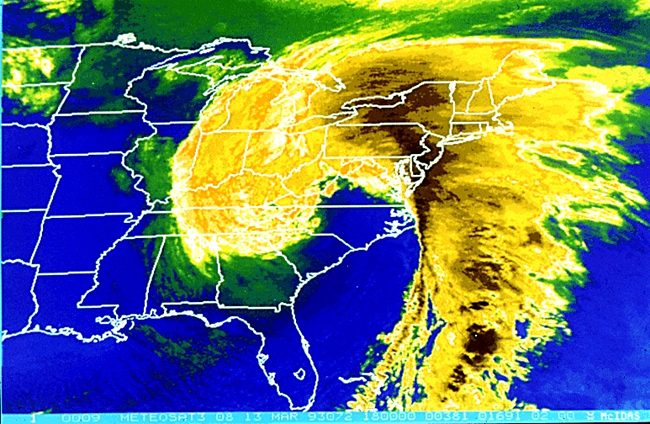
The Superstorm of 1993, a classic Miller type A nor'easter

The Miller classification is a technique that meteorologists use to classify nor'easters. The system splits nor'easters into five categories: Miller A, Miller B, Miller C, Miller D, and Miller E; the classification system initially started out with the first two categories. The system was derived by meteorologist and researcher J.E. Miller in 1946, (not to be confused with R.C. Miller, the Air Force meteorologist who, in 1948, made the world's first successful tornado forecast).

== Background ==
A nor'easter is a macro-scale extratropical cyclone that travels along the East Coast of the United States and Atlantic Canada. The cyclones are called nor'easters because the winds over the coastal area are typically from the northeast. These storms may occur at any time of year, but are most frequent and severe between September and April. Nor'easters usually develop in the latitudes between Georgia and New Jersey, within 100 miles east or west of the coastline. These storms track north-northeastward and typically attain peak intensity between New England and the Maritime Provinces of Canada. The cyclones produce precipitation in the form of heavy rain or snow, or a mix of both, along with gale-force winds. The storms can cause heavy damage in populated cities, such as Washington D.C., Baltimore, Philadelphia, New York City, and Boston. This is possibly due to the fact that the cyclones undergo bombogenesis as they travel along the coast, causing severe conditions from high winds and heavy precipitation.

== Description ==
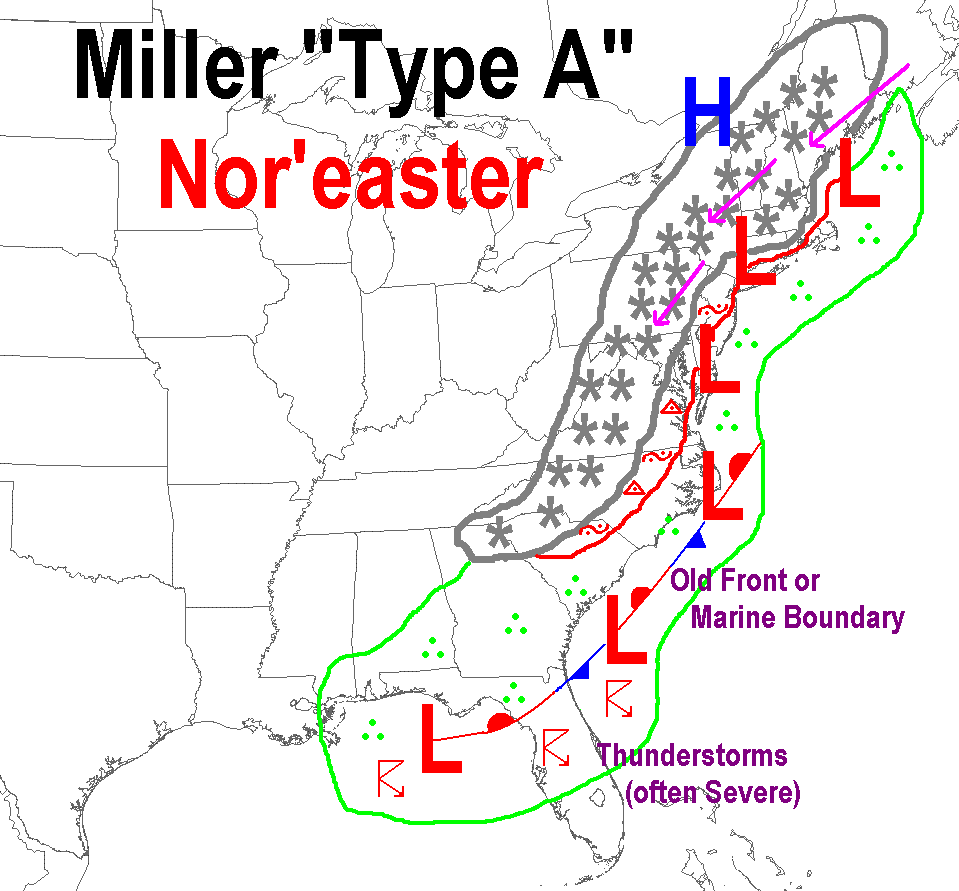
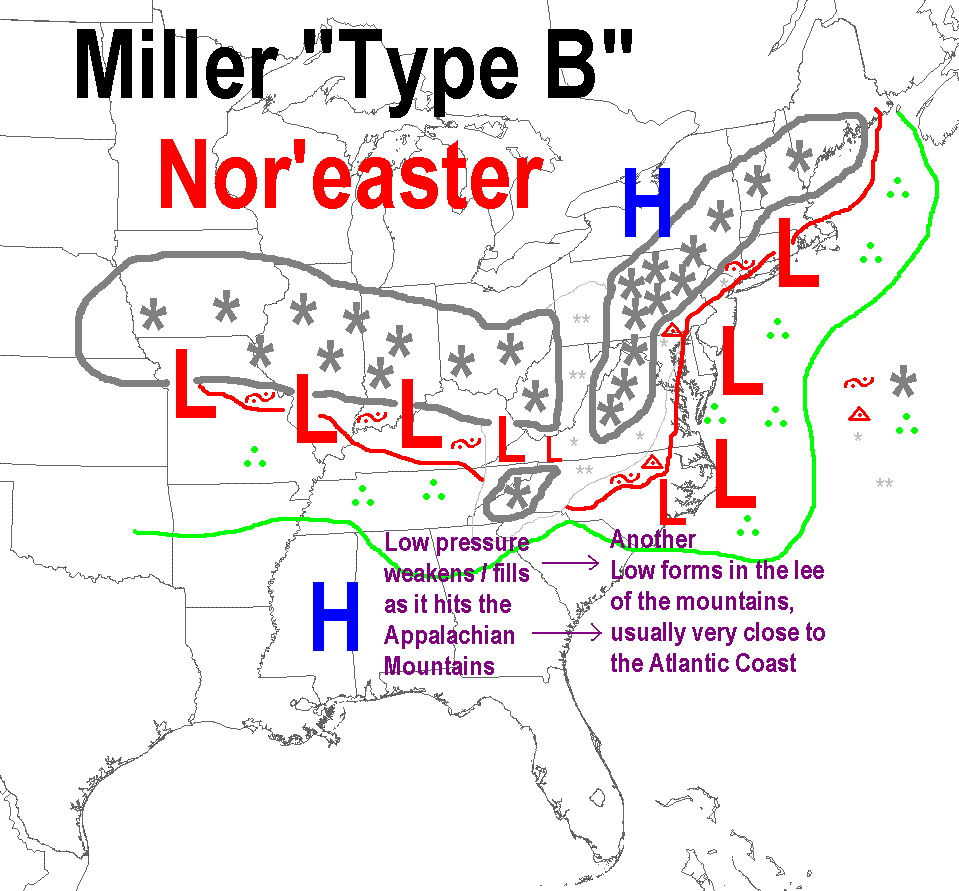
Diagrams of the Miller classifications: type A (top) and type B (bottom)

The Miller classification was created by meteorologist and researcher J.E. Miller in 1946. Meteorologists use the technique to determine the track and severity of nor'easters.

Storms that receive the type A classification develop primarily in the Gulf of Mexico or along the southern East Coast, near Georgia and South Carolina. These storms develop primarily on the Gulf Coast or East Coast along a decaying cold front, or along the marine/land air mass contrast found on the East Coast. Miller A systems then quickly deepen and intensify as they move northeastward. Type A storms typically move rapidly, hitting the Mid-Atlantic United States the hardest. Nevertheless, New England can still receive significant snow depending on the system's intensity. The Superstorm of 1993 is considered to have been a Miller Type-A storm.

Storms that receive the type B classification develop inland over the United States. Storms that come in from the west (up the Ohio Valley) are usually referred to as "Miller Type-B" storms. These storms originate as an area of low pressure creating storming weather over the Midwestern United States and the Ohio River Valley. These storms have a defined low-level circulation center that moves toward the Appalachian Mountains from the west. As these storms approach the mountains, they lose their defined circulation center due to high terrain. A more powerful cyclone spins up along the warm Gulf Stream waters off the coast of North Carolina. When this re-development occurs, the storm produces precipitation, including heavy snow, along the inland parts of the Mid-Atlantic. After redevelopment, the nor'easter takes a northerly track, then turns out to sea near New England. An example of this storm is the February 5–6, 2010 North American blizzard.

=== Additional classification types ===
A study written by Albright and Cobb (2004) showed that there are five predominant patterns that produce four inches or more of snowfall across the Mid-Atlantic. They added classification types C through E, adding onto the Miller classification.

== See also ==
- Regional snowfall index
- Extratropical cyclone
- Cyclogenesis
