= 2016 China floods =

Natural disasters in China

- Date: June–September 2016
- Location: Southern and northern China
- Deaths: 449+ total (350+ from flooding, 99 from tornado)
- Property damage: US$22 billion

In mid-June 2016, severe weather such as heavy rainfall, thunderstorms and hail began across southern China, triggering deadly floods. Over the following month, additional rain events exacerbated flooding and affected more of the country. Areas along the Yangtze River and Huai River have been particularly hard-hit. An estimated 32 million people across 26 provinces were affected and more than 200 people were killed. 280,000 hectares (700,000 acres) of cropland was destroyed, with state damage estimates of around US$5.73 billion. According to Aon Benfield, the damage estimate has reached US$22 billion. Flooding of this magnitude was last seen in the country in 1998. The floods destroyed over 23,600 houses and left 3,600 refugees homeless.

== Background ==
During the late spring and early summer, a semi-permanent frontal boundary—called the meiyu front—emerges across eastern China, Taiwan, and Japan. This feature leads to prolonged periods of heavy rain and thunderstorms which frequently cause damage. Rainfall along this boundary tends to be particularly heavy in post-El Niño summers such as the summer of 2016.

== Cause ==
1. Year 2016 has been defined as El Nino year and the south part of China is largely influenced by this weather phenomena.
2. Many lakes in cities had been turned into land in the development process of modern cities. Because of the enormous demand for food and housing (China population) in China, the natural drainage system has been damaged, water logging leading to problems in inner city development.
3. Many dams have been built along the Yangtze river, reducing the amount of water which could flow through the river.

== Impact ==
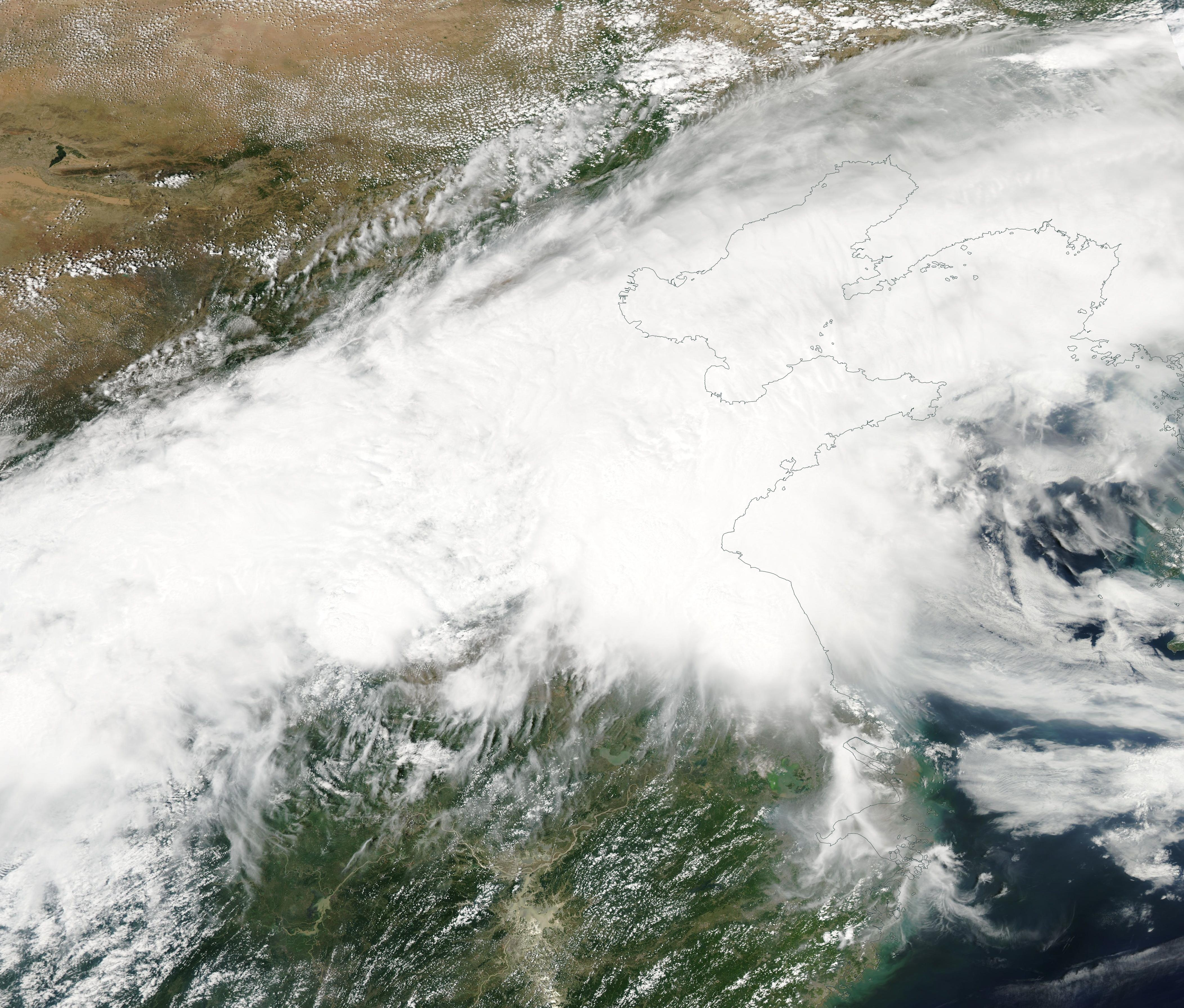
Satellite image of the meiyu front and associated thunderstorms on 23 June when a violent tornado struck Jiangsu

Heavy rainfall in South China began on 14 June, resulting in floods that killed 14 people. Over the following week, flooding spread across seven provinces and claimed a further 22 lives. By 20 June, at least 3.7 million people had been affected by the disaster and 197,000 were displaced. At least 10,500 homes collapsed and damage reached ¥2.7 billion (US$410 million). On 23 June, a violent EF4 tornado devastated communities in Funing and Sheyang Counties within Jiangsu. At least 99 people were killed and 846 others were injured, making it the deadliest tornado to hit China in half a century.

By the end of June, much of Eastern China suffered from flooding with areas along the Yangtze River experiencing the worst effects. More than 200,000 homes were damaged and economic losses reached ¥29 billion (US$4.4 billion).

On 2 July, 23 people were killed and 7 injured when a landslide engulfed a village in Bijie, Guizhou. Photos of two pig farmers on their submerged farm in Lu'an, Anhui went viral leading to 6,000 pigs being rescued from rising waters. The outskirts of Liuzhou, Guangxi was flooded by the swollen Liu River. 35 people were killed after a landslide hit a village in the Kunlun Mountains, Xinjiang on 7 July.

Some areas in northern, central and eastern parts of China have been affected by severe weather, resulting in floods and landslides. By July 28, there were 162 missing and 417 flood deaths were recorded. As a result, The China National Commission for Disaster Management and the Ministry of Civil Affairs issued 16 four-level national responses. However, there is no international support.

The floods in Beijing, Hebei, Shandong, Liaoning and Heilongjiang have had a major impact on China, and the persistent severe weather has affected the southern regions, such as Fujian, Guangdong and Jiangxi. By September 19, typhoons Meranti and Malakas had caused damage to 16 cities and 107 counties. Therefore, the China National Disaster Commission for Disaster Reduction (NCDR) and Ministry of Civil Affairs issued four levels of emergency measures for the Fujian and Zhejiang regions. From September 18 to September 22, more than 8,000 people need assistance, and even 5,400 people need to be moved to temporary housing. 14 people were confirmed dead and 9 others lost contact.

=== Hubei ===
Wuhan saw 570 mm (22 in) of rainfall during the first week of July, surpassing the record that fell on the city in 1991. A red alert for heavy rainfall was issued on 2 July, the same day that eight people died after a 15-metre (49 ft) section of a 2 m (6.6 ft) tall wall collapsed on top of them. The city's subway system, the Wuhan Metro was partially submerged as was the main railway station. In Ezhou, the Mingtang Stadium was flooded, waterlogging the entire pitch within the bowl structure. At least 27 people were killed in the province and 400,000 required evacuation. Flooding encompassed 500,000 hectares (1,200,000 acres) of crops; 15,000 homes collapsed or sustained major damage, and economic losses reached ¥5.7 billion (US$850 million).

== Reactions ==
On 6 July, Chinese Premier Li Keqiang toured Anhui, Hubei and Hunan and called on local officials to prepare for more flooding. At the same time, Chinese Paramount leader Xi Jinping dispatched the Chinese army and armed police to help with flood relief efforts. Media reports have suggested that Typhoon Nepartak may worsen the flooding when it makes landfall traveling from Taiwan.

== See also ==
- 2008 South China floods
- 2010 China floods
- 2011 China floods
- 2013 China floods
- 2015 China floods
- Typhoon Nepartak (2016)
- July 2016 North China cyclone
