= East Asian rainy season =

Monsoon season in East Asia

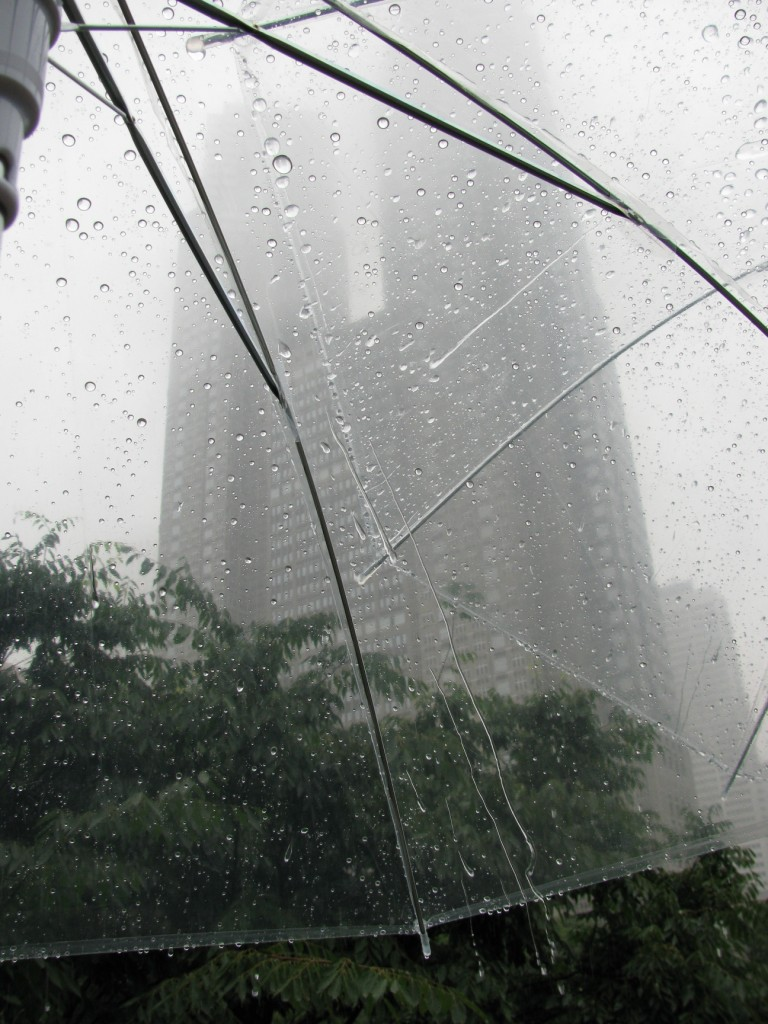
- Plum rain falling on two clear umbrellas, looking up toward the Tokyo Metropolitan Government Building, in June 2009

Chinese name
- Chinese: 梅雨
- Literal meaning: plum rain
Transcriptions
Standard Mandarin
- Hanyu Pinyin: méiyǔ
- Bopomofo: ㄇㄟˊㄩˇ
- IPA: [měiɥỳ]
Hakka
- Romanization: mòi-yí
Yue: Cantonese
- Jyutping: mui4 jyu5
- IPA: mu̖ːy̯jy̗ː
Southern Min
- Hokkien POJ: mûi-ú / bôe-í

Korean name
- Hangul: 장마
- Hanja: 長마
Transcriptions
- Revised Romanization: jangma
- McCune–Reischauer: changma

Japanese name
- Kanji: 梅雨
- Kana: つゆ / ばいう
- Hiragana: つゆ / ばいう
- Katakana: ツユ / バイウ
Transcriptions
- Revised Hepburn: tsuyu / baiu
- Kunrei-shiki: tuyu / baiu

Russian name
- Russian: Восточно-азиатский сезон дождей

The East Asian rainy season, also called the plum rain, is caused by precipitation along a persistent stationary front known as the Meiyu front for nearly two months during the late spring and early summer in East Asia between China, Taiwan, Korea and Japan. The wet season ends during the summer when the subtropical ridge becomes strong enough to push this front north of the region. These weather systems can produce heavy rainfall and flooding.

== Etymology ==
In China, the term "plum rain" (梅雨; meiyu) refers to the rainfall during the fourth and fifth lunar months. It originates from the traditional belief that when plums ripen and begin to fall in the regions south of the Yangtze River during this period, moisture evaporating from the plants transforms into rain.

The term appears in the following poem, dated to 760, by Du Fu:

梅雨
南京犀浦道，四月熟黃梅。
湛湛長江去，冥冥細雨來。
茅茨疏易溼，雲霧密難開。
竟日蛟龍喜，盤渦與岸迴。

Plum rain
On the Xipu road from the Southern Capital (Note: Xipu was a county adjacent to Chengdu.) the fourth month ripens the yellow p[r]unus.
The long river goes off surging, and, darkening, a fine rain comes.
Roof-thatch, loosely bound, is easily soaked, clouds and fog are dense and will not lift.
All day long the dragons delight, whirlpools turning with the bank.

In Japanese, the rainy season is called by the native term tsuyu (梅雨); the spelling is borrowed from the Chinese term, and is an example of jukujikun (a kanji compound whose components are selected for meaning and do not individually represent a sound).

The season is instead commonly called Jangma (장마) in Korea, which means "long rain". The term was originally Dyangmah (댱맣) in 1500s, which was the mix of the hanja character 長 ("long") and the old native Korean word 맣 (mah, "rain"). The word Dyangmah eventually transformed from Jyangma (쟝마) in 1700s to the current form of Jangma after the 1900s.

== Formation ==
An east–west zone of disturbed weather during spring along this front stretches from the east China coast, initially across Taiwan and Okinawa, later, when it has shifted to the north, eastward into the southern peninsula of South Korea and Japan. In Taiwan and Okinawa, the rainy season usually lasts from May to June. In Russian Primorsky Krai, Japan, and Korea, it lasts from June to July (approximately 50 days). In eastern China (especially the Yangtze and Huai River regions), it lasts from mid June to early July.

The weather front forms when the moist air over the Pacific meets the cooler continental air mass. The front and the formation of frontal depressions along it brings precipitation to Primorsky Krai, Japan, Korea, eastern China, and Taiwan. As the front moves back and forth depending on the strength of cool and warm air masses, there is often prolonged precipitation and sometimes flooding in eastern China. However, in the years that it does not rain as much as usual, a drought might result. The rainy season ends when the warm air mass associated with the subtropical ridge is strong enough to push the front north and away.

== Effects ==
The high humidity in the air during this season encourages the formation of mold and rot not only on food but on fabrics as well. Environmentally, heavy rains encourage mudslides and flooding in all areas affected. The most rain in a one-hour period as recorded in Japan was in Nagasaki in 1982 with 153 millimetres (6.0 in). The highest overall recorded rainfall during the rainy season in Japan was in 2003 when Miyazaki Prefecture recorded rains of 8,670 millimetres (341 in).

=== Japan ===
In Japan, the rainy season is called tsuyu (梅雨), and lasts from early June to mid-July in most of the country (Honshu, Kyushu and Shikoku), approximately June 7 to July 20 in the Kansai and Kantō regions in Honshū. The tsuyu season is roughly a month earlier (early May through mid-June) in Okinawa (the southernmost region of the country). There is no pronounced tsuyu season in Hokkaidō (the northernmost region of the country) because the tsuyu front usually attenuates before it reaches the region so that it cannot produce the abundant rainfall. Tsuyu is also known as Samidare (五月雨, literally "the fifth-month rain (in the Japanese traditional calendar)", roughly corresponding to June in the modern calendar). The pop artist Eiichi Ohtaki produced a popular song by this name, and a Second World War Japanese naval ship was also given this name.

=== Korea ===
The rainy season is between June and mid-July. It is caused by hot and humid high pressure forming in the Sea of Okhotsk due to the North Pacific anticyclone combining with Asiatic continental high pressure. When the two meteorological events meet they form a long jangmajeonseon (Korean: 장마전선, from 장마; lit. 'rainy season' and 전선; 前線; lit. 'weather front'). Beginning in late May, the North Pacific high pressure forces the weaker continental anticyclone south of Okinawa Island. This fall to the south then reverses and gradually strengthens as it moves northwards back towards the Korean peninsula. On landfall, heavy monsoon rains lead to torrential downpours and flooding. By August the system has weakened as the southern systems retreat towards the Philippine archipelago.

By early autumn, the North Pacific high-pressure system is pushed away as Asiatic continental cold high pressure moves southwards. This produces inclement weather although not on the scale of the summer monsoons. Korea can, however, be struck by typhoons during this period.

== Timing ==
In some years, the rainy season's actual beginning and end are under debate. For example, in 2005, the subtropical ridge moved quickly northward in late June/early July. The weather front skipped the Yangtze region and there was no rainy season there. Then, the ridge retreated southward and there was significant rainfall in the region. This gave rise to the question of whether this was the summer-type rainfall pattern that is common after the first rainy season or the second rainy season. Some meteorologists even argued that the rainy period in late June was not a true rainy season.

== See also ==
- East Asian monsoon
- Meiyu front
- List of China-related topics
- List of Japan-related topics
- List of Taiwan related topics
