= Cyclolysis =

Dissipation of a cyclone

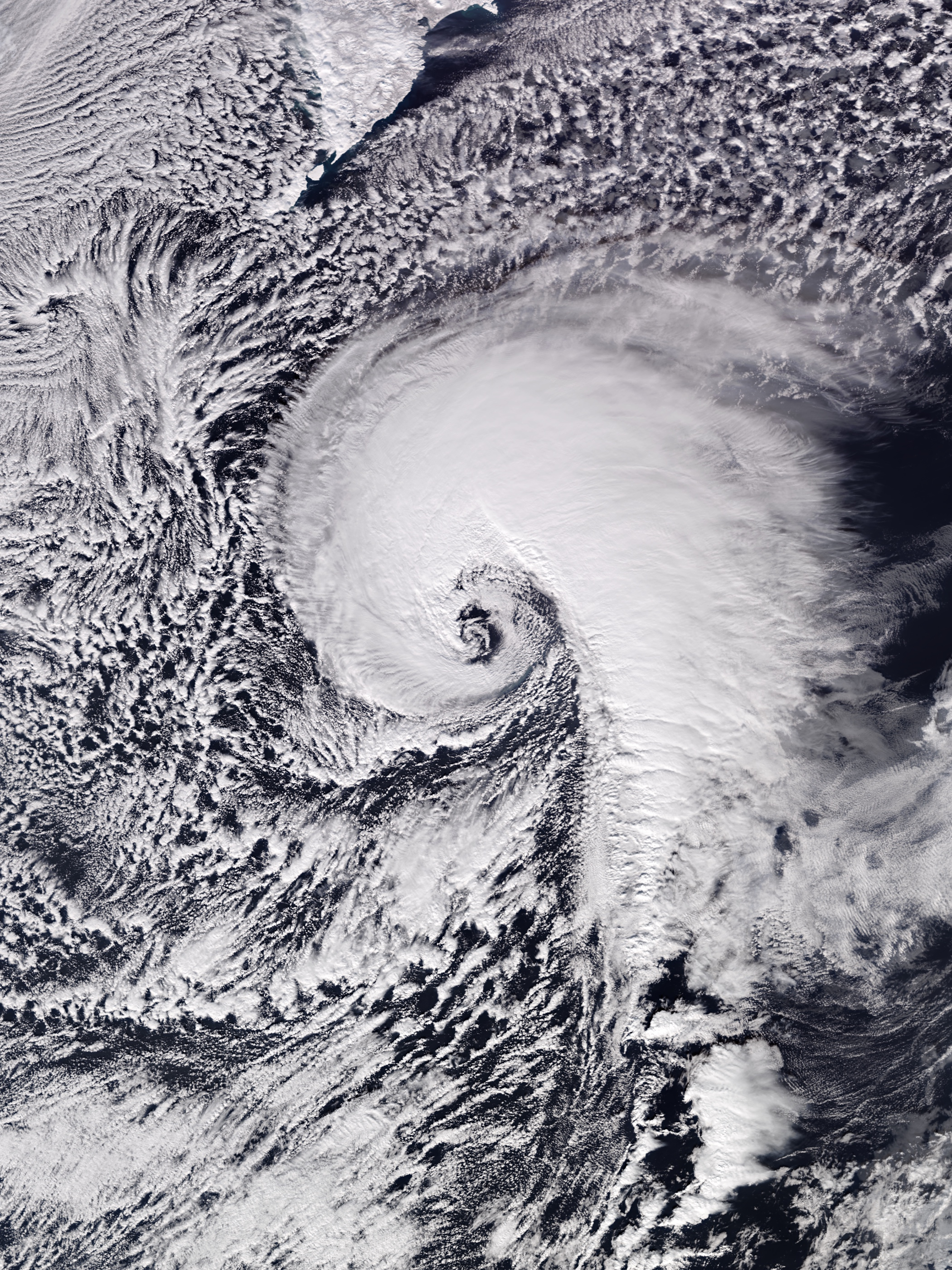
A compact extratropical cyclone initiating the process of cyclolysis. It fully dissipated in a day.

Cyclolysis is a process in which a cyclonic circulation weakens and deteriorates. Cyclolysis is the opposite of cyclogenesis.

== Extratropical cyclones ==
Extratropical cyclones usually undergo cyclolysis after an occluded front forms, which separates the center of the cyclone from the warm air. With the center of the cyclone surrounded by cool air, the temperature difference or baroclinity begins to decline, and the jet stream persisting over the strongest areas of baroclinity which is not over the center of the cyclone, which makes it so that the jet stream is unable to support the system. This usually causes decay and dissipation of the cyclone. When an extratropical cyclone has completed cyclolysis, it usually is not connected to any weather fronts. Extratropical cyclones in the northern hemisphere tend to undergo cyclolysis over the northeast Atlantic Ocean, northwestern Europe, the Gulf of Alaska, the Pacific Northwest, northeast Canada, central Russia, or the eastern Mediterranean sea. In the southern hemisphere, most extratropical cyclones undergo cyclolysis north of 50°S.

== Tropical cyclones ==
Tropical cyclones often undergo cyclolysis after making landfall, especially if the land is mountainous as the friction with the terrain is increased. Its supply of warm, moist maritime air is also cut off when it moves over land. However, the brown ocean effect may cause a tropical cyclone to maintain its strength, or even intensify over land. A tropical cyclone may also undergo cyclolysis if it moves over water cooler than 26.5 °C (79.7 °F) as this will cause it to lose its tropical characteristics and become a remnant low. However, these remnant cyclones may persist for a few more days. Excessive wind shear can also cause cyclolysis as it causes the convection that powers the tropical cyclone to move away from the center.

== Mesocyclones ==
Mesocyclones are localized storms, approximately 2 km (1.2 mi) to 10 km (6.2 mi) in diameter within strong thunderstorms. Thunderstorms containing persistent mesocyclones are supercell thunderstorms. Mesocyclones typically undergo cyclolysis when the gust front of the storm blocks off the updraft. At this point, cyclonic circulation weakens, and tornadic supercells lift off the ground. The thunderstorm begins to dissipate as well.
