= Low-pressure area =

Area with air pressures lower than adjacent areas

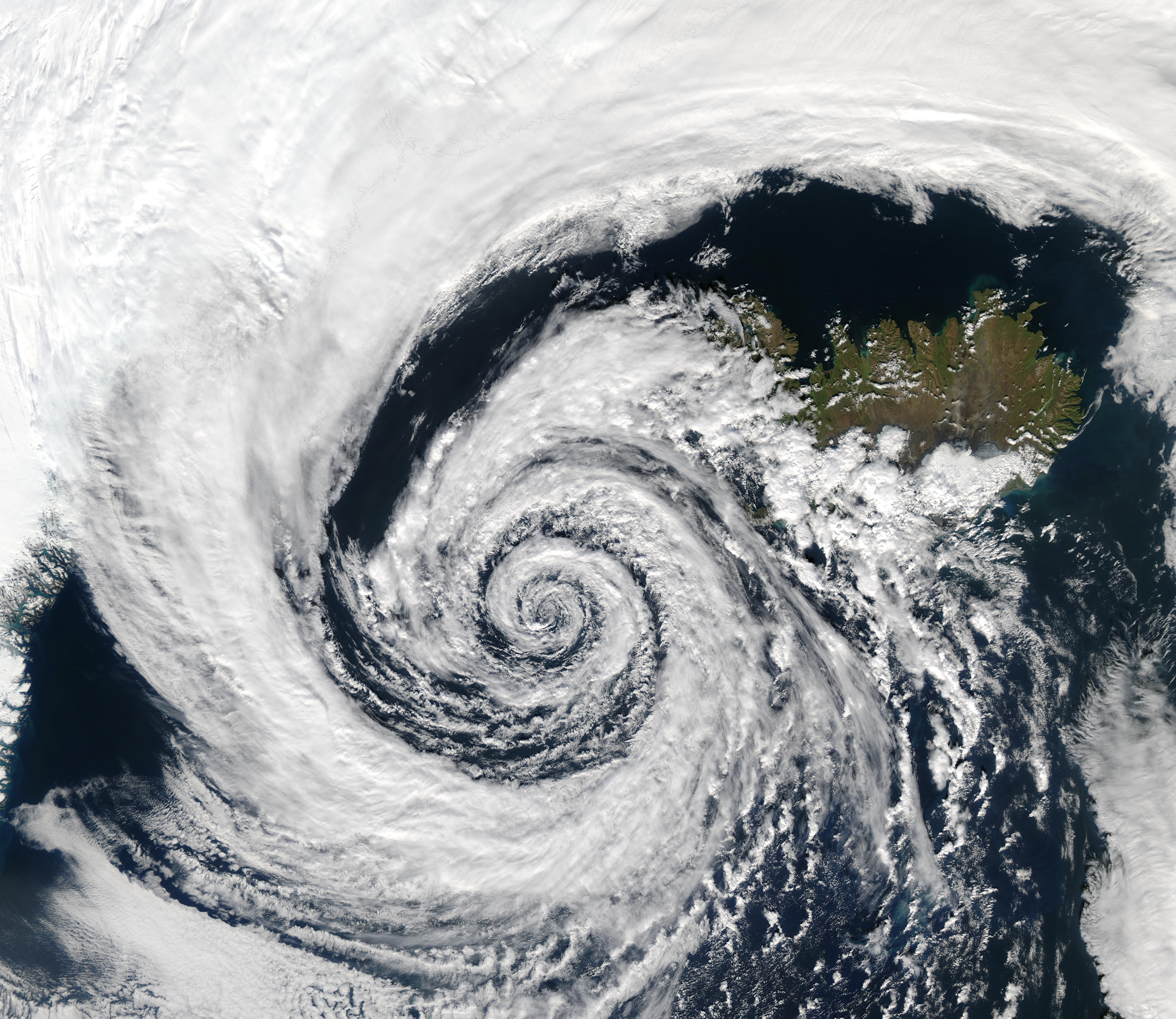
A low-pressure system over Iceland

In meteorology, a low-pressure area (LPA), low area, or low is a region where the atmospheric pressure is lower than that of surrounding locations. It is the opposite of a high-pressure area. Low-pressure areas are commonly associated with inclement weather (such as cloudy or windy weather, with possible rain or storms), while high-pressure areas are associated with lighter winds and clear skies. Winds circle anti-clockwise around lows in the northern hemisphere, and clockwise in the southern hemisphere, by dint of opposing Coriolis forces. Large low-pressure, rotating air masses whose winds spiral inward are termed cyclones.

Low-pressure systems form under areas of wind divergence that occur in the upper levels of the atmosphere (aloft). The formation process of a low-pressure area is known as cyclogenesis. In meteorology, atmospheric divergence aloft occurs in two kinds of places:

- The first is in the area on the east side of upper troughs, which form half of a Rossby wave within the Westerlies (a trough with large wavelength that extends through the troposphere).
- A second is an area where wind divergence aloft occurs ahead of embedded shortwave troughs, which are of smaller wavelength.

Diverging winds aloft, ahead of these troughs, cause atmospheric lift within the troposphere below as air flows upwards away from the surface, which lowers surface pressures as this upward motion partially counteracts the force of gravity packing the air close to the ground.

Thermal lows form through localized heating caused by greater solar incidence over deserts and other land masses. Since localized areas of warm air are less dense than their surroundings, this warmer air rises, which lowers atmospheric pressure near that portion of the Earth's surface. Large-scale thermal lows over continents help drive monsoon circulations. Low-pressure areas can also be caused by organized thunderstorm activity over warm water. When this occurs over the tropics in concert with the Intertropical Convergence Zone, it is known as a monsoon trough. Monsoon troughs reach their northerly extent in August and their southerly extent in February. When a convective low acquires a well-hot circulation in the tropics it is termed a tropical cyclone. Tropical cyclones can form during any month of the year globally.

Atmospheric lift will also generally produce cloud cover through adiabatic cooling once the air temperature drops below the dew point as it rises, the cloudy skies typical of low-pressure areas act to dampen diurnal temperature extremes. Since clouds reflect sunlight, incoming shortwave solar radiation decreases, causing lower temperatures during the day. At night the absorptive effect of clouds on outgoing longwave radiation, such as heat energy from the surface, allows for warmer nighttime minimums in all seasons. The stronger the area of low pressure, the stronger the winds experienced in its vicinity. Globally, low-pressure systems are most frequently located over the Tibetan Plateau and in the lee of the Rocky Mountains. In Europe (particularly in the British Isles and Netherlands), recurring low-pressure weather systems are typically known as "low levels."

On English-language weather maps, low-pressure centers are identified by the letter L.

== Formation ==
Cyclogenesis is the development and strengthening of cyclonic circulations, or low-pressure areas, within the atmosphere. Cyclogenesis is the opposite of cyclolysis, and has an anticyclonic (high-pressure system) equivalent which deals with the formation of high-pressure areas—anticyclogenesis. Cyclogenesis is an umbrella term for several different processes, all of which result in the development of some sort of cyclone. Meteorologists use the term "cyclone" where circular pressure systems flow in the direction of the Earth's rotation, which normally coincides with areas of low pressure. The largest low-pressure systems are cold-core polar cyclones and extratropical cyclones which lie on the synoptic scale. Warm-core cyclones such as tropical cyclones, mesocyclones, and polar lows lie within the smaller mesoscale. Subtropical cyclones are of intermediate size. Cyclogenesis can occur at various scales, from the microscale to the synoptic scale. Larger-scale troughs, also called Rossby waves, are synoptic in scale. Shortwave troughs embedded within the flow around larger scale troughs are smaller in scale, or mesoscale in nature. Both Rossby waves and shortwaves embedded within the flow around Rossby waves migrate equatorward of the polar cyclones located in both the Northern and Southern hemispheres. All share one important aspect, that of upward vertical motion within the troposphere. Such upward motions decrease the mass of local atmospheric columns of air, which lowers surface pressure.

Extratropical cyclones form as waves along weather fronts when a shortwave aloft or upper-level jet streak passes by before occluding later in their life cycle as cold-core cyclones. Polar lows are small-scale, short-lived atmospheric low-pressure systems that occur over the ocean areas poleward of the main polar front in both the Northern and Southern Hemispheres. They are part of the larger class of mesoscale weather-systems. Polar lows can be difficult to detect using conventional weather reports and are a hazard to high-latitude operations, such as shipping and offshore platforms. They are vigorous systems that have near-surface winds of at least 17 metres per second (38 mph).

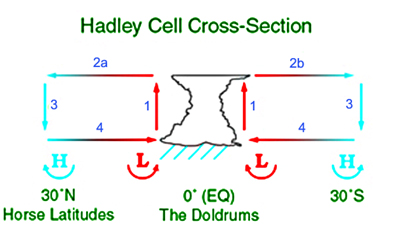
This depiction of the Hadley cell shows the process which sustains low-pressure areas. Diverging winds aloft allow for lower pressure and convergence at the Earth's surface, which leads to upward motion.

Tropical cyclones form through latent heat driven by significant thunderstorm activity, and have warm cores with well-defined circulations. Certain criteria need to be met for their formation. In most situations, water temperatures of at least 26.5 °C (79.7 °F) are needed down to a depth of at least 50 m (160 ft); waters of this temperature cause the overlying atmosphere to be unstable enough to sustain convection and thunderstorms. Another factor is rapid cooling with height, which allows the release of the heat of condensation that powers a tropical cyclone. High humidity is needed, especially in the lower-to-mid troposphere; when there is a great deal of moisture in the atmosphere, conditions are more favorable for disturbances to develop. Low amounts of wind shear are needed, as high shear is disruptive to the storm's circulation. Lastly, a formative tropical cyclone needs a pre-existing system of disturbed weather, although without a circulation no cyclonic development will take place. Mesocyclones form as warm core cyclones over land, and can lead to tornado formation. Waterspouts can also form from mesocyclones, but more often develop from environments of high instability and low vertical wind shear.

In deserts, lack of ground and plant moisture that would provide evaporative cooling can lead to intense, rapid solar heating of the lower layers of air. The hot air is less dense than surrounding cooler air, and so it will rise. This results in a low-pressure area called a thermal low. Monsoon circulations are caused by thermal lows which form over large areas of land; land heats more quickly than the nearby ocean. This generates a steady wind blowing toward the land, bringing the moist near-surface air over the oceans with it. Rainfall is caused by this moist air being lifted upwards by mountains, surface heating, convergence at the surface, divergence aloft, or from storm-produced outflows at the surface. However the lifting occurs, the air cools by expansion in lower pressure, which in turn produces condensation. In winter, the land cools off quickly, but the ocean retains the heat longer because of its higher specific heat capacity. The hot air over the ocean rises, creating a low-pressure area and a breeze from land to ocean while a large area of drying high pressure is formed over the land, increased by wintertime cooling. Monsoons resemble sea and land breezes, terms usually referring to the localized, diurnal (daily) cycle of circulation near coastlines everywhere, but they are much larger in scale, and also stronger and seasonal.

== Climatology ==
=== Mid-latitudes and subtropics ===
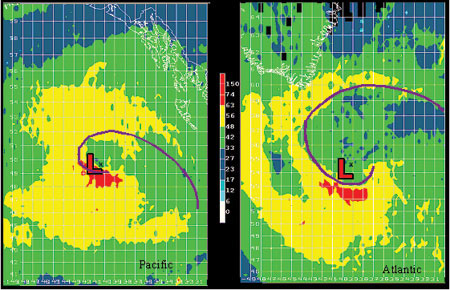
QuikSCAT image of typical extratropical cyclones over the ocean. Note the maximum winds on the poleward side of the occluded front.

Large polar cyclones help determine the steering of systems moving through the mid-latitudes, south of the Arctic and north of the Antarctic. The Arctic oscillation provides an index used to gauge the magnitude of this effect in the Northern Hemisphere. Extratropical cyclones tend to form east of climatological trough positions aloft near the east coast of continents, or west side of oceans. A study of extratropical cyclones in the Southern Hemisphere shows that between the 30th and 70th parallels there are an average of 37 cyclones in existence during any 6-hour period. A separate study in the Northern Hemisphere suggests that approximately 234 significant extratropical cyclones form each winter. In Europe, particularly in the United Kingdom and in the Netherlands, recurring extratropical low-pressure weather systems are typically known as depressions. These tend to bring wet weather throughout the year. Thermal lows also occur during the summer over continental areas across the subtropics - such as the Sonoran Desert, the Mexican Plateau, the Sahara, South America, and Southeast Asia. The lows are most commonly located over the Tibetan Plateau and in the lee of the Rocky Mountains.

=== Monsoon trough ===
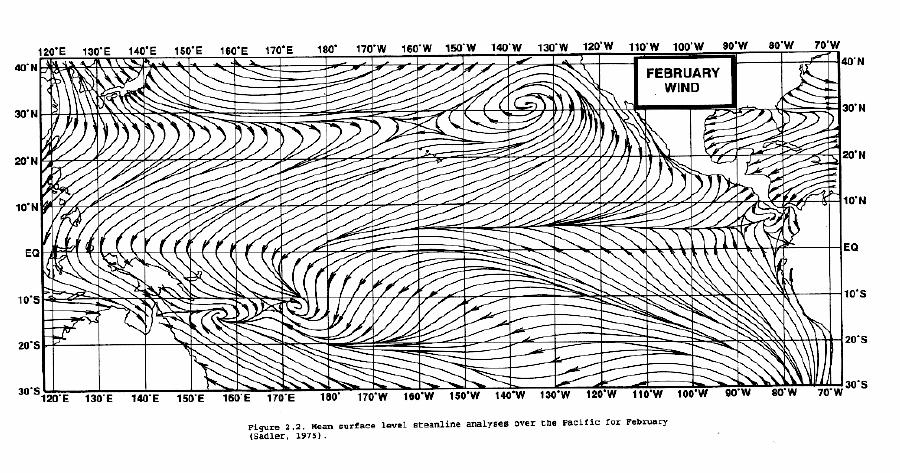
February position of the ITCZ and monsoon trough in the Pacific Ocean, depicted by area of convergent streamlines offshore Australia and in the equatorial eastern Pacific

Elongated areas of low pressure form at the monsoon trough or Intertropical Convergence Zone as part of the Hadley cell circulation. Monsoon troughing in the western Pacific reaches its zenith in latitude during the late summer when the wintertime surface ridge in the opposite hemisphere is the strongest. It can reach as far as the 40th parallel in East Asia during August and 20th parallel in Australia during February. Its poleward progression is accelerated by the onset of the summer monsoon which is characterized by the development of lower air pressure over the warmest part of the various continents. The large-scale thermal lows over continents help create pressure gradients which drive monsoon circulations. In the southern hemisphere, the monsoon trough associated with the Australian monsoon reaches its most southerly latitude in February, oriented along a west-northwest/east-southeast axis. Many of the world's rainforests are associated with these climatological low-pressure systems.

=== Tropical cyclone ===
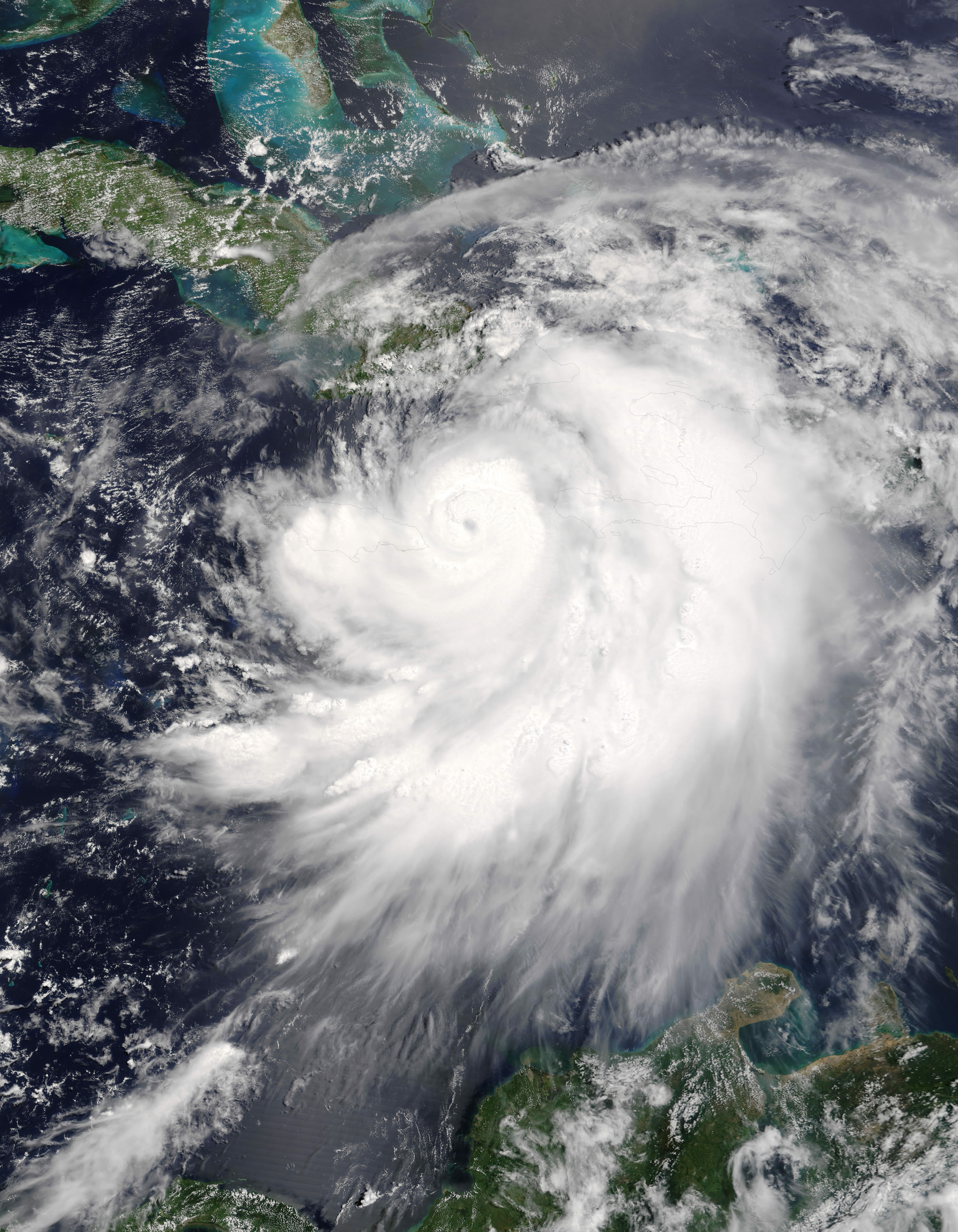
A visible image of Hurricane Dennis intensifying in the Jamaica Channel

Tropical cyclones generally need to form poleward of the 5th parallel north and 5th parallel south, i.e. more than 555 km (345 mi) from the equator, allowing the Coriolis effect to deflect winds blowing towards the low-pressure center and creating a circulation. Worldwide, tropical cyclone activity peaks in late summer, when the difference between temperatures aloft and at the sea surface is greatest. However, each particular basin has its own seasonal patterns. On a worldwide scale, May is the least active month while September is the most active month. Nearly one-third of the world's tropical cyclones form within the western Pacific Ocean, making it the most active tropical cyclone basin on Earth.

== Associated weather ==
Schematic representation of flow (represented in black) around a low-pressure area in the Northern hemisphere. The pressure-gradient force is represented by blue arrows, the Coriolis acceleration (always perpendicular to the velocity) by red arrows.

Wind is initially accelerated from areas of high pressure to areas of low pressure. This is due to density (or temperature and moisture) differences between two air masses. Since stronger high-pressure systems contain cooler or drier air, the air mass is denser and flows towards areas that are warm or moist, which are in the vicinity of low-pressure areas in advance of their associated cold fronts. The stronger the pressure difference, or pressure gradient, between a high-pressure system and a low-pressure system, the stronger the wind. Thus, stronger areas of low pressure are associated with stronger winds.

The Coriolis force caused by the Earth's rotation is what gives winds around low-pressure areas (such as in hurricanes, cyclones, and typhoons) their counter-clockwise (anticlockwise) circulation in the northern hemisphere (as the wind moves inward and is deflected right from the center of high pressure) and clockwise circulation in the southern hemisphere (as the wind moves inward and is deflected left from the center of high pressure). A simple rule is that for low-pressure areas, where generally air flows inwards to their centers, the coriolis force given by the earth's rotation to the air circulation points, if viewed from above the particular hemisphere's pole, to the same direction as the earth's apparent rotation.

A tropical cyclone differs from a hurricane or typhoon based only on geographic location. A tropical cyclone is fundamentally different from a mid-latitude cyclone. A hurricane is a storm that occurs in the Atlantic Ocean and northeastern Pacific Ocean, a typhoon occurs in the northwestern Pacific Ocean, and a tropical cyclone occurs in the south Pacific or Indian Ocean. Friction with land slows down the wind flowing into low-pressure systems and causes wind to flow more inward, or flowing more ageostrophically, toward their centers. Tornadoes are often too small, and of too short duration, to be influenced directly by the Coriolis force, but may be so-influenced when arising from a low-pressure system.

== See also ==
- East Asian Monsoon
- High-pressure area
- Intertropical Convergence Zone
- North American Monsoon
- Surface weather analysis
- Tropical wave
- Trough (meteorology)
- Weather map
