= Anticyclogenesis =

Development of anticyclonic circulation

Anticyclogenesis is the development or strengthening of an anticyclonic circulation in the atmosphere. It is the opposite of anticyclolysis (the dissolution or weakening of an anticyclone) and has a cyclonic equivalent known as cyclogenesis. Anticyclones are alternatively referred to as high pressure systems.

== Process ==
High-pressure systems form due to downward motion through the troposphere, the atmospheric layer where weather occurs. Preferred areas within a synoptic flow pattern in higher levels of the troposphere are beneath the western side of troughs. On weather maps, these areas show converging winds (isotachs), also known as confluence, or converging height lines near or above the level of non-divergence, which is near the 500 hPa pressure surface about midway up through the troposphere. On weather maps, high-pressure centers are associated with the letter H placed within the isobar with the highest pressure value. On constant pressure upper level charts, it is located within the highest height line contour.

== See also ==
- Anticyclonic storm – Type of storm
- Cyclogenesis – The development or strengthening of cyclonic circulation in the atmosphere
- High-pressure area – Region with higher atmospheric pressure
