= Extratropical cyclone =

Type of cyclone

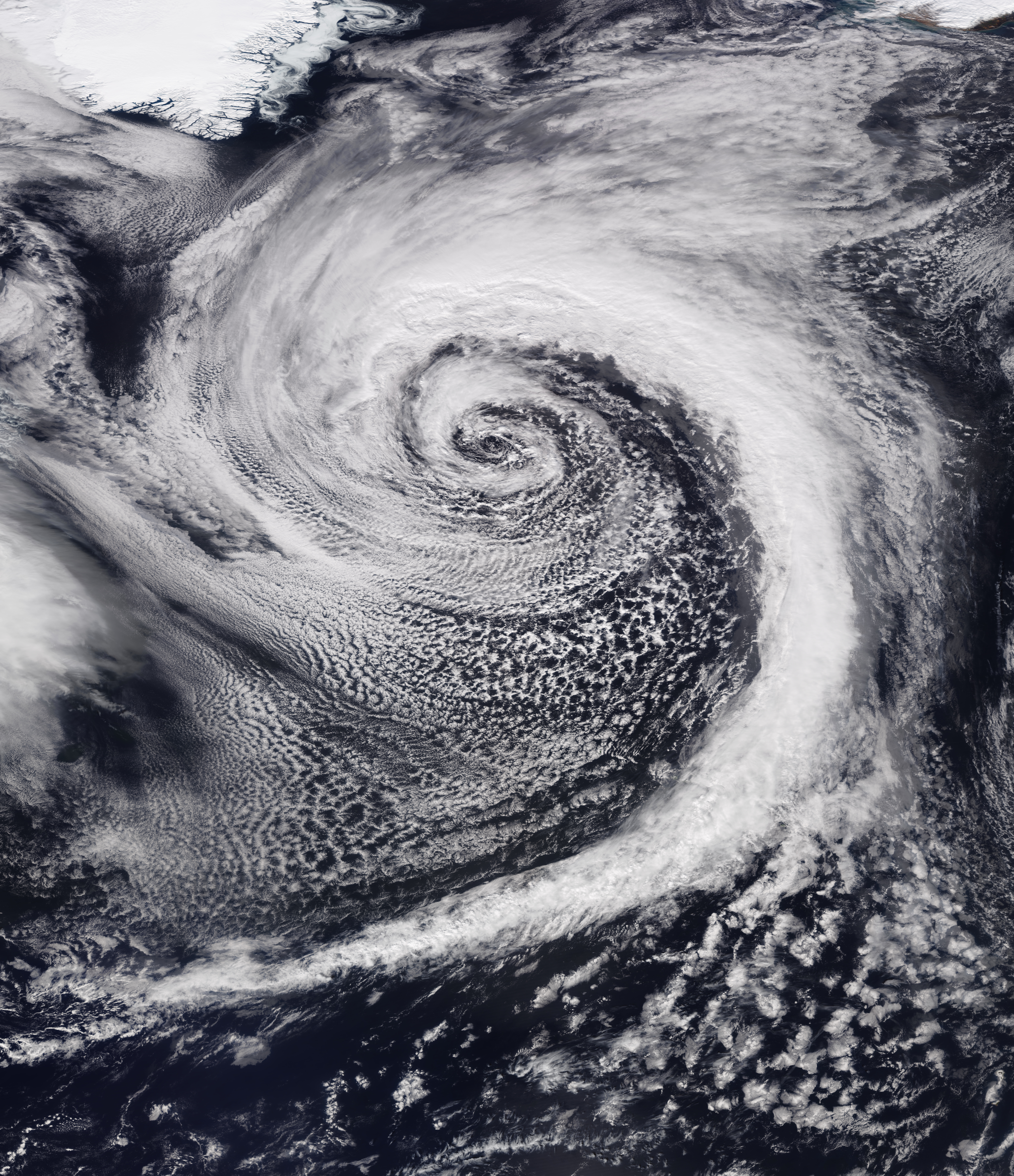
A powerful extratropical cyclone over the North Atlantic Ocean on 20 March 2022; Greenland at the top left, and Iceland at the top right

Extratropical cyclones, sometimes called mid-latitude cyclones or wave cyclones are low-pressure areas which, along with anticyclones, drive the weather over much of the mid-latitudes of the Earth. Extratropical cyclones are capable of producing a range of weather conditions from wind, cloudiness and mild showers to severe hail, thunderstorms, blizzards, and tornadoes. This type of cyclone is thus defined as a large scale (synoptic) low pressure weather system occurring in the middle latitudes of the Earth. In contrast with tropical cyclones, extratropical cyclones produce rapid changes in temperature and dew point along broad lines called weather fronts, which are present about the center of the cyclone.

== Terminology ==
This animation shows an extratropical cyclone developing over the United States, starting late on 25 October 2010 and running through to 27 October 2010.

The term "cyclone" applies to numerous types of low pressure areas, one of which is the extratropical cyclone. The descriptor extratropical signifies that this type of cyclone generally occurs outside the tropics and in the middle latitudes of Earth between 30° and 60° latitude. They are termed mid-latitude cyclones if they form within those latitudes, or post-tropical cyclones if a tropical cyclone has intruded into the mid latitudes. Weather forecasters and the general public often describe them simply as "depressions" or "lows". Terms like frontal cyclone, frontal depression, frontal low, extratropical low, non-tropical low and hybrid low are often used as well.

Extratropical cyclones are classified mainly as baroclinic, because they form along zones of temperature and dewpoint gradient known as frontal zones. They can become barotropic late in their life cycle, when the distribution of heat around the cyclone becomes fairly uniform with its radius.

== Formation ==
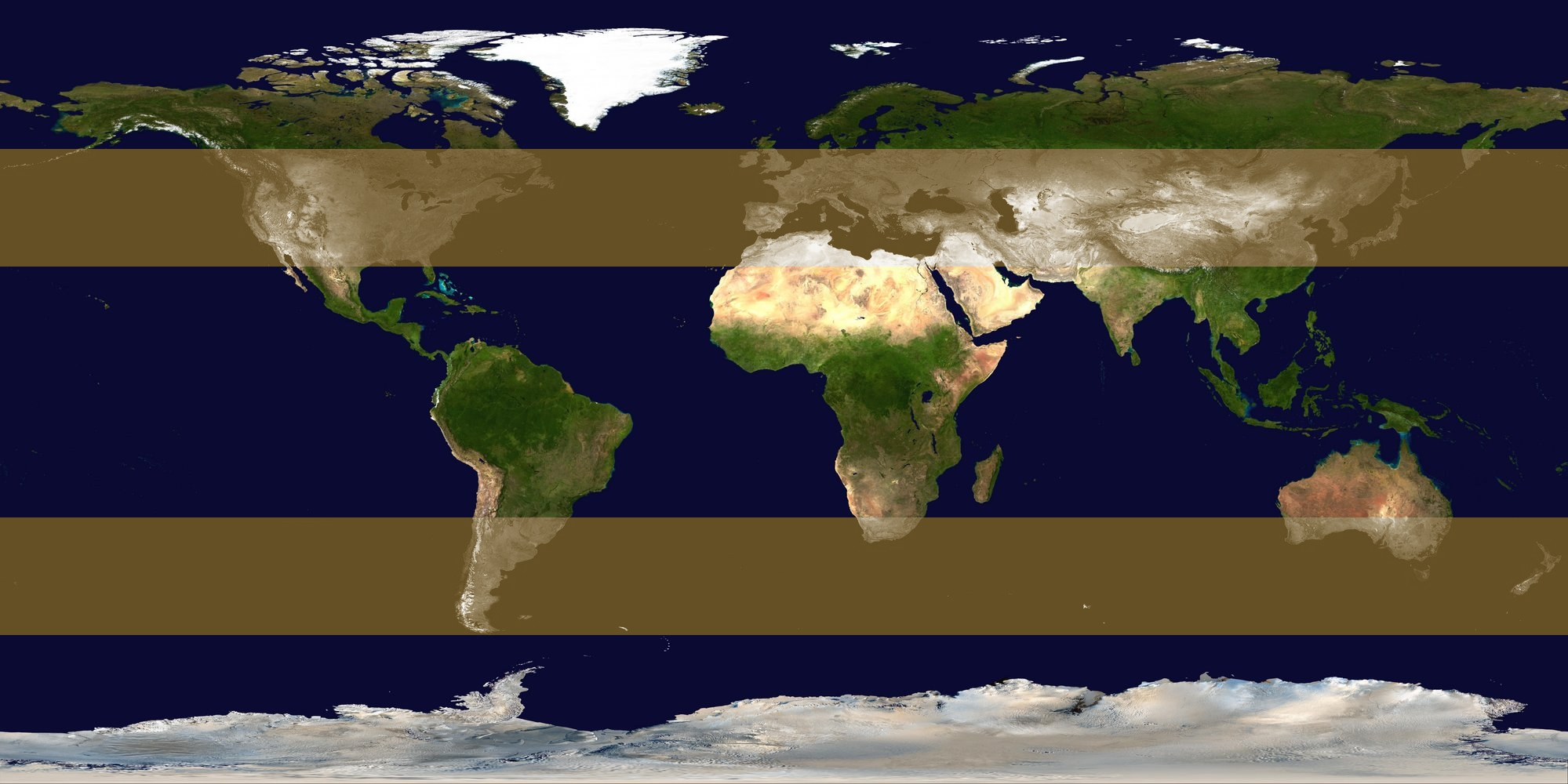
Approximate areas of extratropical cyclone formation worldwide

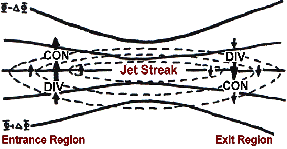
An upper-level jet streak. DIV areas are regions of divergence aloft, which will lead to surface convergence and aid cyclogenesis.

Extratropical cyclones form anywhere within the extratropical regions of the Earth (usually between 30° and 60° latitude from the equator), either through cyclogenesis or extratropical transition. In a climatology study with two different cyclone algorithms, a total of 49,745–72,931 extratropical cyclones in the Northern Hemisphere and 71,289–74,229 extratropical cyclones in the Southern Hemisphere were detected between 1979 and 2018 based on reanalysis data. A study of extratropical cyclones in the Southern Hemisphere shows that between the 30th and 70th parallels, there are an average of 37 cyclones in existence during any 6-hour period. A separate study in the Northern Hemisphere suggests that approximately 234 significant extratropical cyclones form each winter.

=== Cyclogenesis ===
Extratropical cyclones form along linear bands of temperature/dew point gradient with significant vertical wind shear, and are thus classified as baroclinic cyclones. Initially, cyclogenesis, or low pressure formation, occurs along frontal zones near a favorable quadrant of a maximum in the upper level jetstream known as a jet streak. The favorable quadrants are usually at the right rear and left front quadrants, where divergence ensues. The divergence causes air to rush out from the top of the air column. As mass in the column is reduced, atmospheric pressure at surface level (the weight of the air column) is reduced. The lowered pressure strengthens the cyclone (a low pressure system). The lowered pressure acts to draw in air, creating convergence in the low-level wind field. Low-level convergence and upper-level divergence imply upward motion within the column, making cyclones cloudy. As the cyclone strengthens, the cold front sweeps towards the equator and moves around the back of the cyclone. Meanwhile, its associated warm front progresses more slowly, as the cooler air ahead of the system is denser, and therefore more difficult to dislodge. Later, the cyclones occlude as the poleward portion of the cold front overtakes a section of the warm front, forcing a tongue, or trowal, of warm air aloft. Eventually, the cyclone will become barotropically cold and begin to weaken.

Atmospheric pressure can fall very rapidly when there are strong upper level forces on the system. When pressures fall more than 1 millibar (0.030 inHg) per hour, the process is called explosive cyclogenesis, and the cyclone can be described as a bomb. These bombs rapidly drop in pressure to below 980 millibars (28.94 inHg) under favorable conditions such as near a natural temperature gradient like the Gulf Stream, or at a preferred quadrant of an upper-level jet streak, where upper level divergence is best. The stronger the upper level divergence over the cyclone, the deeper the cyclone can become. Hurricane-force extratropical cyclones are most likely to form in the northern Atlantic and northern Pacific oceans in the months of December and January. On 14 and 15 December 1986, an extratropical cyclone near Iceland deepened to below 920 millibars (27 inHg), which is a pressure equivalent to a category 5 hurricane. In the Arctic, the average pressure for cyclones is 980 millibars (28.94 inHg) during the winter, and 1,000 millibars (29.53 inHg) during the summer.

=== Extratropical transition ===
Hurricane Cristobal in the north Atlantic after completing its transition from a hurricane to an extratropical cyclone

Tropical cyclones often transform into extratropical cyclones at the end of their tropical existence, usually between 30° and 40° latitude, where there is sufficient forcing from upper-level troughs or shortwaves riding the Westerlies for the process of extratropical transition to begin. During this process, a cyclone in extratropical transition (known across the eastern North Pacific and North Atlantic oceans as the post-tropical stage), will invariably form or connect with nearby fronts and/or troughs consistent with a baroclinic system. Due to this, the size of the system will usually appear to increase, while the core weakens. However, after transition is complete, the storm may re-strengthen due to baroclinic energy, depending on the environmental conditions surrounding the system. The cyclone will also distort in shape, becoming less symmetric with time.

During extratropical transition, the cyclone begins to tilt back into the colder airmass with height, and the cyclone's primary energy source converts from the release of latent heat from condensation (from thunderstorms near the center) to baroclinic processes. The low pressure system eventually loses its warm core and becomes a cold-core system.

The peak time of subtropical cyclogenesis (the midpoint of this transition) in the North Atlantic is in the months of September and October, when the difference between the temperature of the air aloft and the sea surface temperature is the greatest, leading to the greatest potential for instability. On rare occasions, an extratropical cyclone can transform into a tropical cyclone if it reaches an area of ocean with warmer waters and an environment with less vertical wind shear. An example of this happening is in the 1991 Perfect Storm. The process known as "tropical transition" involves the usually slow development of an extratropically cold core vortex into a tropical cyclone.

The Joint Typhoon Warning Center uses the extratropical transition (XT) technique to subjectively estimate the intensity of tropical cyclones becoming extratropical based on visible and infrared satellite imagery. Loss of central convection in transitioning tropical cyclones can cause the Dvorak technique to fail; the loss of convection results in unrealistically low estimates using the Dvorak technique. The system combines aspects of the Dvorak technique, used for estimating tropical cyclone intensity, and the Hebert-Poteat technique, used for estimating subtropical cyclone intensity. The technique is applied when a tropical cyclone interacts with a frontal boundary or loses its central convection while maintaining its forward speed or accelerating. The XT scale corresponds to the Dvorak scale and is applied in the same way, except that "XT" is used instead of "T" to indicate that the system is undergoing extratropical transition. Also, the XT technique is only used once extratropical transition begins; the Dvorak technique is still used if the system begins dissipating without transition. Once the cyclone has completed transition and become cold-core, the technique is no longer used.

== Structure ==
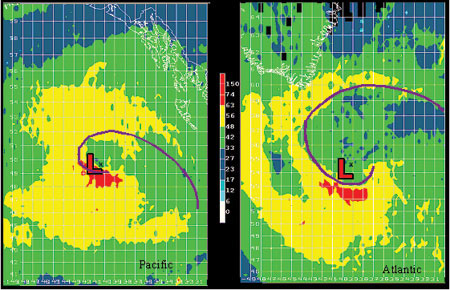
QuikSCAT image of typical extratropical cyclones over the ocean. Note the maximum winds are on the outside of the occlusion.

=== Surface pressure and wind distribution ===
The windfield of an extratropical cyclone constricts with distance in relation to surface level pressure, with the lowest pressure being found near the center, and the highest winds typically just on the cold/poleward side of warm fronts, occlusions, and cold fronts, where the pressure gradient force is highest. The area poleward and west of the cold and warm fronts connected to extratropical cyclones is known as the cold sector, while the area equatorward and east of its associated cold and warm fronts is known as the warm sector.

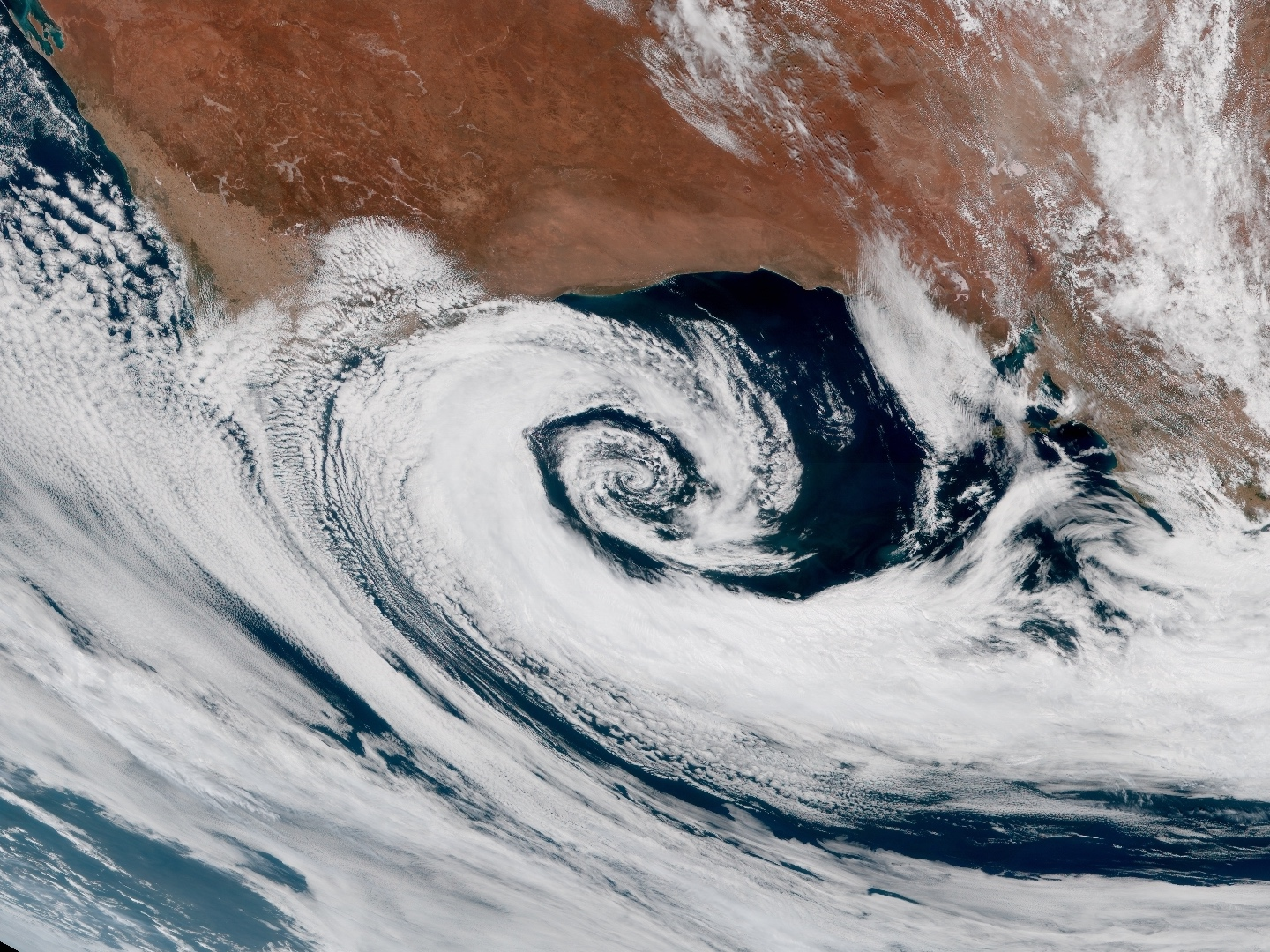
Extratropical cyclones spin clockwise in the Southern Hemisphere, just like tropical cyclones.

The wind flow around an extratropical cyclone is counterclockwise in the northern hemisphere, and clockwise in the southern hemisphere, due to the Coriolis effect (this manner of rotation is generally referred to as cyclonic). Near this center, the pressure gradient force (from the pressure at the center of the cyclone compared to the pressure outside the cyclone) and the Coriolis force must be in an approximate balance for the cyclone to avoid collapsing in on itself as a result of the difference in pressure. The central pressure of the cyclone will lower with increasing maturity, while outside of the cyclone, the sea-level pressure is about average. In most extratropical cyclones, the part of the cold front ahead of the cyclone will develop into a warm front, giving the frontal zone (as drawn on surface weather maps) a wave-like shape. Due to their appearance on satellite images, extratropical cyclones can also be referred to as frontal waves early in their life cycle. In the United States, an old name for such a system is "warm wave".

In the northern hemisphere, once a cyclone occludes, a trough of warm air aloft—or "trowal" for short—will be caused by strong southerly winds on its eastern periphery rotating aloft around its northeast, and ultimately into its northwestern periphery (also known as the warm conveyor belt), forcing a surface trough to continue into the cold sector on a similar curve to the occluded front. The trowal creates the portion of an occluded cyclone known as its comma head, due to the comma-like shape of the mid-tropospheric cloudiness that accompanies the feature. It can also be the focus of locally heavy precipitation, with thunderstorms possible if the atmosphere along the trowal is unstable enough for convection.

=== Vertical structure ===
Extratropical cyclones slant back into colder air masses and strengthen with height, sometimes exceeding 30,000 feet (approximately 9 km) in depth. Above the surface of the earth, the air temperature near the center of the cyclone is increasingly colder than the surrounding environment. These characteristics are the direct opposite of those found in their counterparts, tropical cyclones; thus, they are sometimes called "cold-core lows". Various charts can be examined to check the characteristics of a cold-core system with height, such as the 700 millibars (20.67 inHg) chart, which is at about 10,000 feet (3,048 meters) altitude. Cyclone phase diagrams are used to tell whether a cyclone is tropical, subtropical, or extratropical.

== Cyclone evolution ==
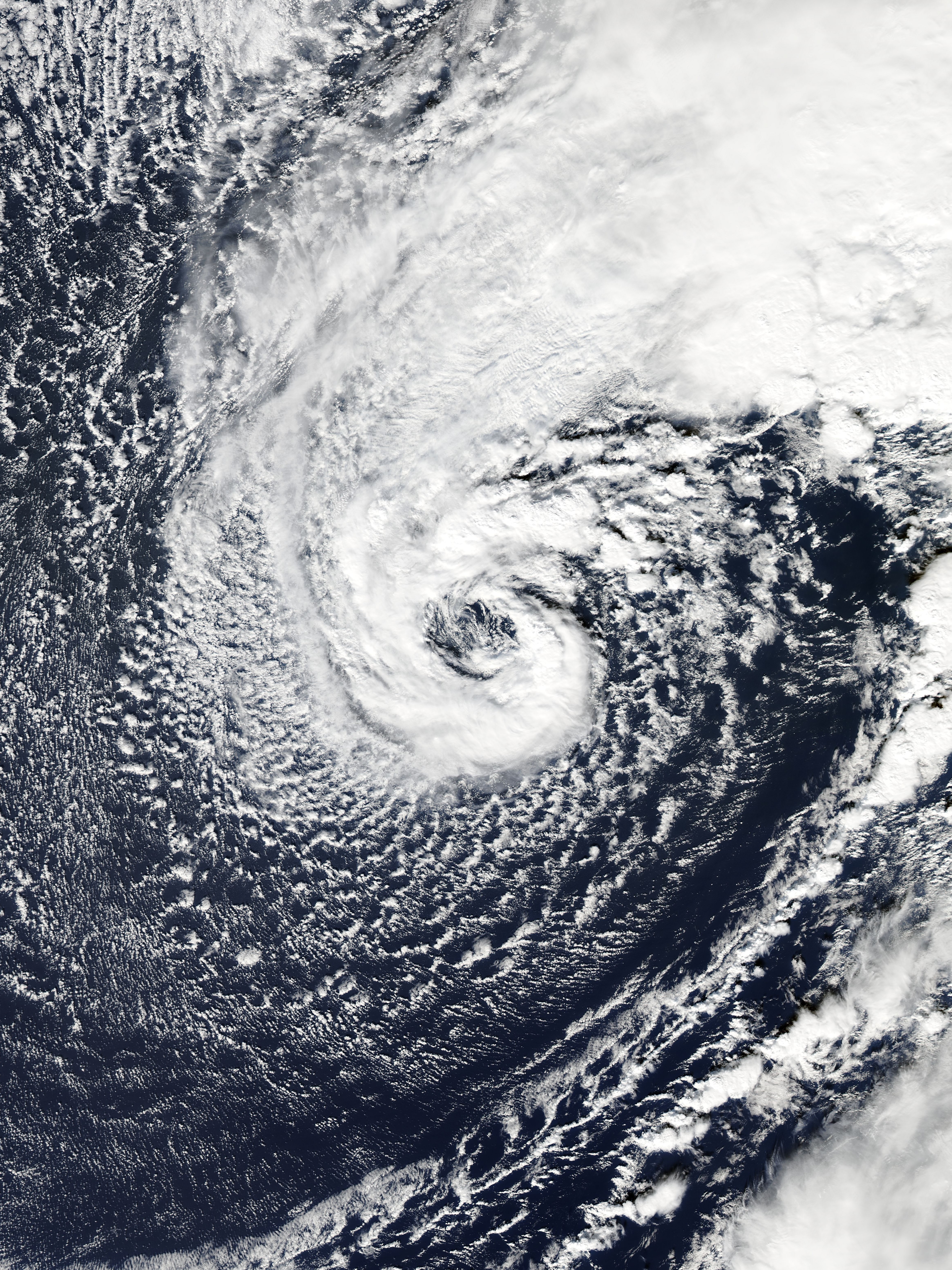
A hurricane-force extratropical cyclone in the north Atlantic in January 2016 with a distinct eye-like feature, caused by a warm seclusion. This system would later undergo tropical cyclogenesis and become Hurricane Alex.

There are two models of cyclone development and life cycles in common use, the Norwegian model and the Shapiro–Keyser model.

=== Norwegian cyclone model ===
Of the two theories on extratropical cyclone structure and life cycle, the older is the Norwegian Cyclone Model, developed during World War I. In this theory, cyclones develop as they move up and along a frontal boundary, eventually occluding and reaching a barotropically cold environment. It was developed completely from surface-based weather observations, including descriptions of clouds found near frontal boundaries. This theory still retains merit, as it is a good description for extratropical cyclones over continental landmasses.

=== Shapiro–Keyser model ===
A second competing theory for extratropical cyclone development over the oceans is the Shapiro–Keyser model, developed in 1990. Its main differences with the Norwegian Cyclone Model are the fracture of the cold front, treating warm-type occlusions and warm fronts as the same, and allowing the cold front to progress through the warm sector perpendicular to the warm front. This model was based on oceanic cyclones and their frontal structure, as seen in surface observations and in previous projects which used aircraft to determine the vertical structure of fronts across the northwest Atlantic. In a Shapiro–Keyser low pressure system, broken frontal systems allow warm air to reach the core of the low, resulting in stronger updraughts and greater intensification of the low; this was demonstrated by Storm Bram in the northeast Atlantic on 9–10 December 2025.

==== Warm seclusion ====
A warm seclusion is the mature phase of the extratropical cyclone life cycle. This was conceptualized after the ERICA field experiment of the late 1980s, which produced observations of intense marine cyclones that indicated an anomalously warm low-level thermal structure, secluded (or surrounded) by a bent-back warm front and a coincident chevron-shaped band of intense surface winds. The Norwegian Cyclone Model, as developed by the Bergen School of Meteorology, largely observed cyclones at the tail end of their lifecycle and used the term occlusion to identify the decaying stages.

Warm seclusions may have cloud-free, eye-like features at their center (reminiscent of tropical cyclones), significant pressure falls, hurricane-force winds, and moderate to strong convection. The most intense warm seclusions often attain pressures less than 950 millibars (28.05 inHg) with a definitive lower to mid-level warm core structure. A warm seclusion, the result of a baroclinic lifecycle, occurs at latitudes well poleward of the tropics.

As latent heat flux releases are important for their development and intensification, most warm seclusion events occur over the oceans; they may impact coastal nations with hurricane force winds and torrential rain. Climatologically, the Northern Hemisphere sees warm seclusions during the cold season months, while the Southern Hemisphere may see a strong cyclone event such as this during all times of the year.

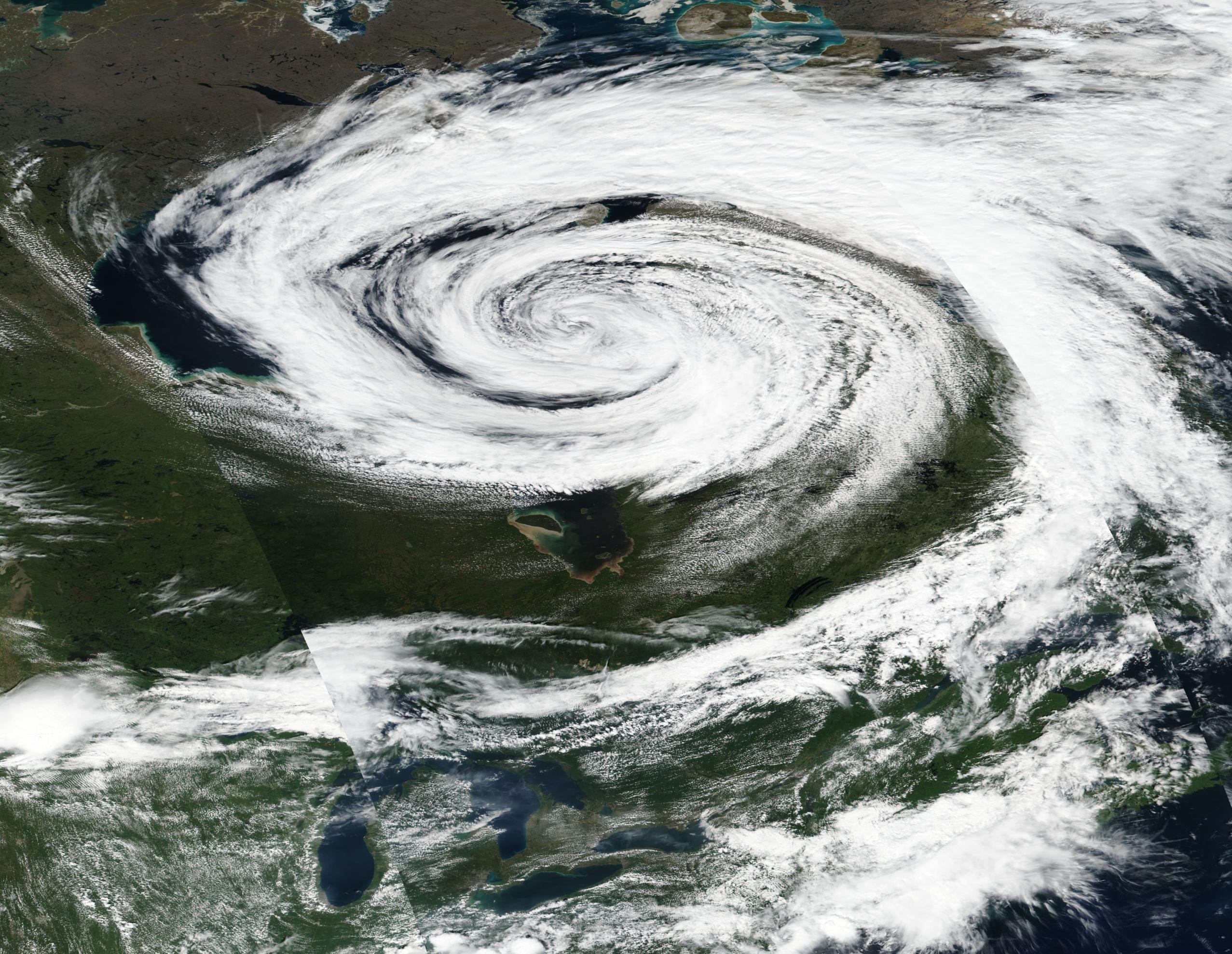
A Powerful Bomb Cyclone on August 10, 2016, over the Hudson Bay

In all tropical basins, except the Northern Indian Ocean, the extratropical transition of a tropical cyclone may result in reintensification into a warm seclusion. For example, Hurricane Maria (2005) and Hurricane Cristobal (2014) each re-intensified into a strong baroclinic system and achieved warm seclusion status at maturity (or lowest pressure).

== Motion ==
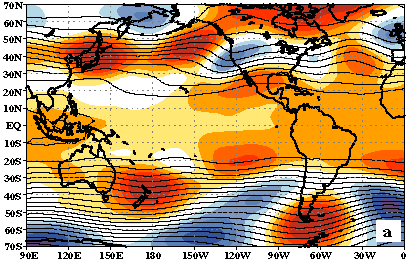
A zonal flow regime. Note the dominant west-to-east flow as shown in the 500 hPa height pattern.

A 24 February 2007 radar image of a large extratropical cyclonic storm system at its peak over the central United States.

Extratropical cyclones are generally driven, or "steered", by deep westerly winds in a general west to east motion across both the Northern and Southern hemispheres of the Earth. This general motion of atmospheric flow is known as "zonal". Where this general trend is the main steering influence of an extratropical cyclone, it is known as a "zonal flow regime".

When the general flow pattern buckles from a zonal pattern to the meridional pattern, a slower movement in a north or southward direction is more likely. Meridional flow patterns feature strong, amplified troughs and ridges, generally with more northerly and southerly flow.

Changes in direction of this nature are most commonly observed as a result of a cyclone's interaction with other low pressure systems, troughs, ridges, or with anticyclones. A strong and stationary anticyclone can effectively block the path of an extratropical cyclone. Such blocking patterns are quite normal, and will generally result in a weakening of the cyclone, the weakening of the anticyclone, a diversion of the cyclone towards the anticyclone's periphery, or a combination of all three to some extent depending on the precise conditions. It is also common for an extratropical cyclone to strengthen as the blocking anticyclone or ridge weakens in these circumstances.

Where an extratropical cyclone encounters another extratropical cyclone (or almost any other kind of cyclonic vortex in the atmosphere), the two may combine to become a binary cyclone, where the vortices of the two cyclones rotate around each other (known as the "Fujiwhara effect"). This most often results in a merging of the two low pressure systems into a single extratropical cyclone, or can less commonly result in a mere change of direction of either one or both of the cyclones. The precise results of such interactions depend on factors such as the size of the two cyclones, their strength, their distance from each other, and the prevailing atmospheric conditions around them.

== Effects ==
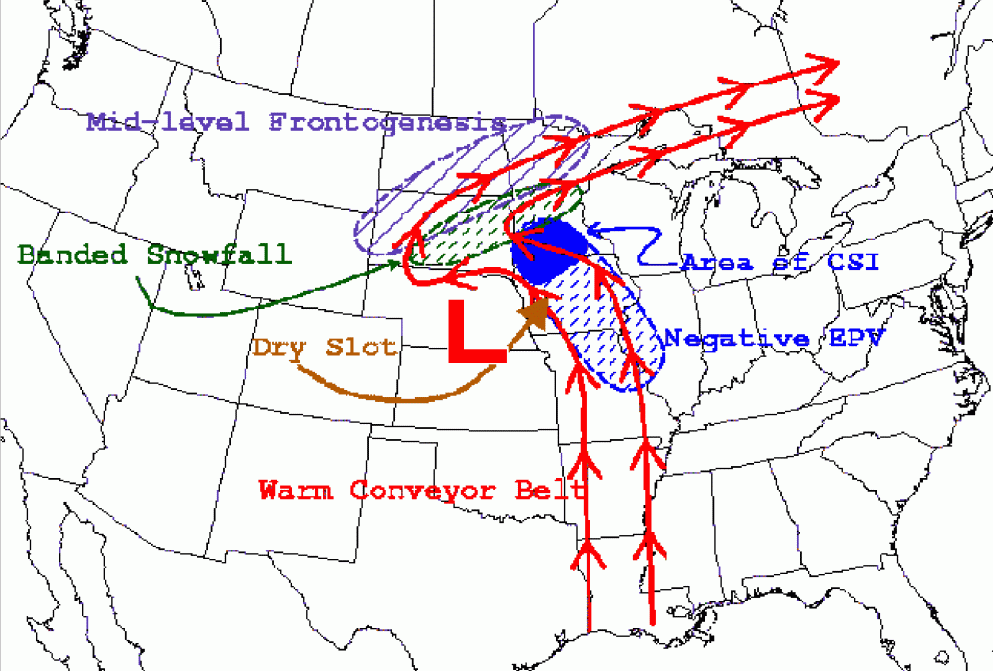
Preferred region of snowfall in an extratropical cyclone

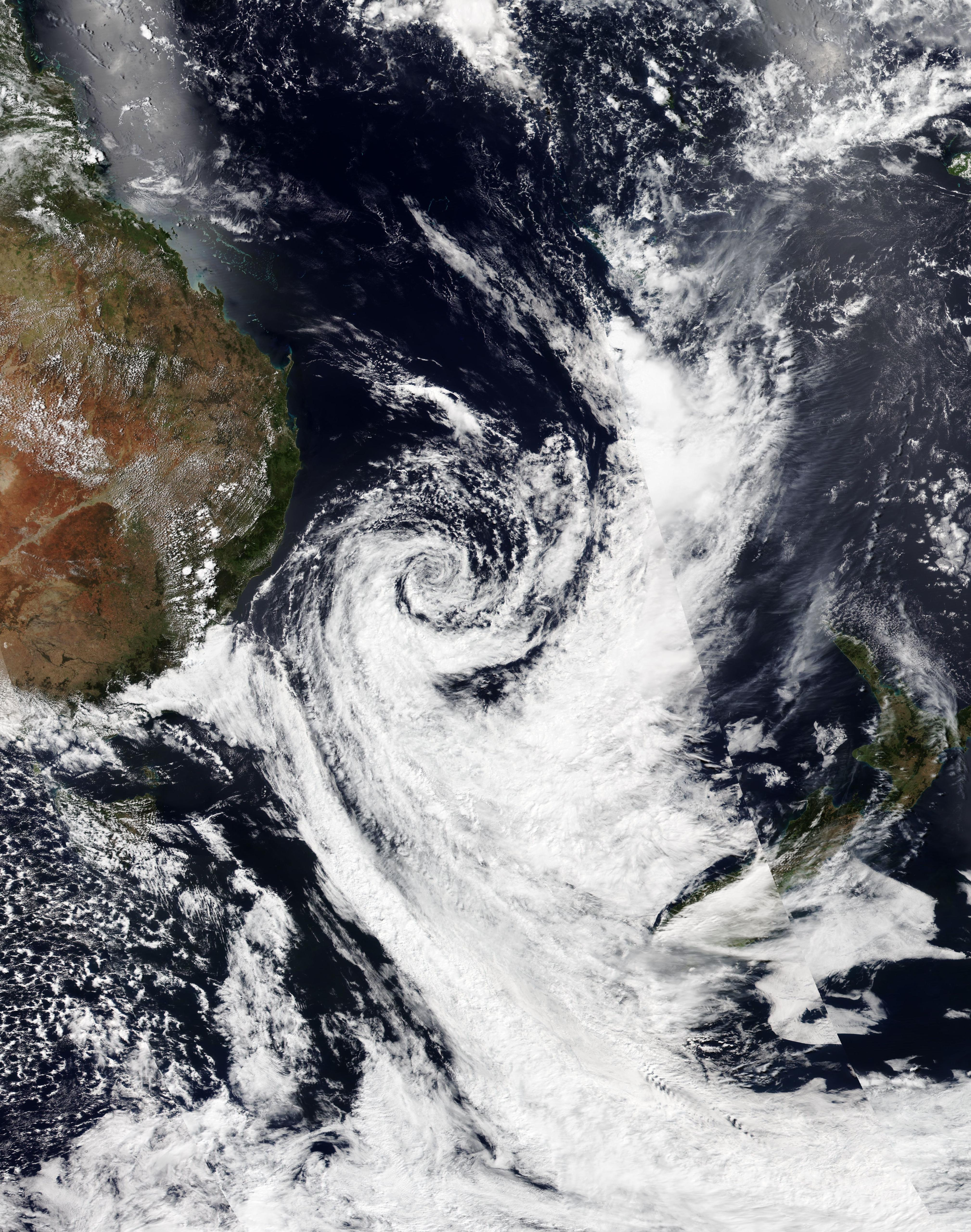
An east coast low approaching southeastern Australia

=== General ===
Extratropical cyclones can bring little rain and surface winds of 15–30 km/h (10–20 mph), or they can be dangerous with torrential rain and winds exceeding 119 km/h (74 mph), and so they are sometimes referred to as windstorms in Europe. The band of precipitation that is associated with the warm front is often extensive. In mature extratropical cyclones, an area known as the comma head on the northwest periphery of the surface low can be a region of heavy precipitation, frequent thunderstorms, and thundersnows. Cyclones tend to move along a predictable path at a moderate rate of progress. During fall, winter, and spring, the atmosphere over continents can be cold enough through the depth of the troposphere to cause snowfall.

=== Severe weather ===
Squall lines, or solid bands of strong thunderstorms, can form ahead of cold fronts and lee troughs due to the presence of significant atmospheric moisture and strong upper level divergence, leading to hail and high winds. When significant directional wind shear exists in the atmosphere ahead of a cold front in the presence of a strong upper-level jet stream, tornado formation is possible. Although tornadoes can form anywhere on Earth, the greatest number occur in the Great Plains in the United States, because downsloped winds off the north–south oriented Rocky Mountains, which can form a dry line, aid their development at any strength.

Explosive development of extratropical cyclones can be sudden. The storm known in Great Britain and Ireland as the "Great Storm of 1987" deepened to 953 millibars (28.14 inHg) with a highest recorded wind of 220 km/h (140 mph), resulting in the loss of 19 lives, 15 million trees, widespread damage to homes and an estimated economic cost of £1.2 billion (US$2.3 billion).

Although most tropical cyclones that become extratropical quickly dissipate or are absorbed by another weather system, they can still retain winds of hurricane or gale force. In 1954, Hurricane Hazel became extratropical over North Carolina as a strong Category 3 storm. The Columbus Day Storm of 1962, which evolved from the remains of Typhoon Freda, caused heavy damage in Oregon and Washington, with widespread damage equivalent to at least a Category 3. In 2005, Hurricane Wilma began to lose tropical characteristics while still sporting Category 3-force winds (and became fully extratropical as a Category 1 storm).

In summer, extratropical cyclones are generally weak, but some of the systems can cause significant floods overland because of torrential rainfall. The July 2016 North China cyclone never brought gale-force sustained winds, but it caused devastating floods in mainland China, resulting in at least 184 deaths and ¥33.19 billion (US$4.96 billion) of damage.

An emerging topic is the co-occurrence of wind and precipitation extremes, so-called compound extreme events, induced by extratropical cyclones. Such compound events account for 3–5% of the total number of cyclones.

=== Climate and general circulation ===
In the classic analysis by Edward Lorenz (the Lorenz energy cycle), extratropical cyclones (so-called atmospheric transients) acts as a mechanism in converting potential energy that is created by pole to equator temperature gradients to eddy kinetic energy. In the process, the pole-equator temperature gradient is reduced (i.e. energy is transported poleward to warm up the higher latitudes).

The existence of such transients are also closely related to the formation of the Icelandic and Aleutian Low — the two most prominent general circulation features in the mid- to sub-polar northern latitudes. The two lows are formed by both the transport of kinetic energy and the latent heating (the energy released when water phase changed from vapor to liquid during precipitation) from the mid- latitude cyclones.

== Historic storms ==
Extratropical cyclones have been responsible for some of the most damaging floods in European history. The Great storm of 1703 killed over 8,000 people and the North Sea flood of 1953 killed over 2,500 and destroyed 3,000 houses. In 2002, floods in Europe caused by two genoa lows caused $27.115 billion in damages and 232 fatalities, the most damaging flood in European since at least 1985. In late December 1999, Cyclones Lothar and Martin caused 140 deaths combined and over $23 billion in damages in Central Europe, the costliest European windstorms in history.

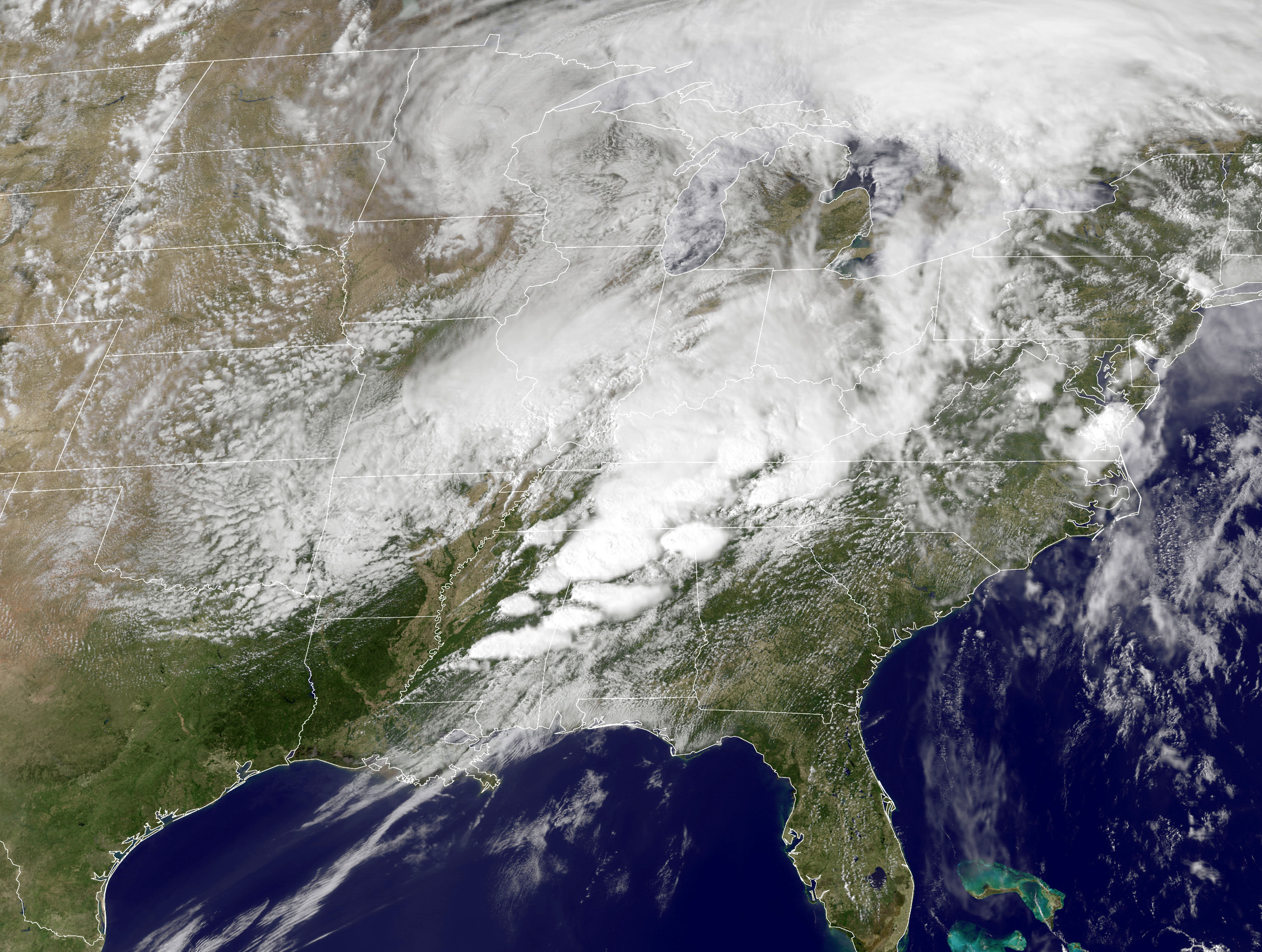
The extratropical cyclone responsible for the 2011 Super Outbreak

In October 2012, Hurricane Sandy transitioned into an extratropical cyclone off the coast of the Northeastern United States. The storm killed over 100 people and caused $65 billion in damages, the second costliest tropical cyclone at the time. Other extratropical cyclones have been related to major tornado outbreaks. The tornado outbreaks of April 1965, April 1974 and April 2011 were all large, violent, and deadly tornado outbreaks related to extratropical cyclones. Similarly, winter storms in March 1888, November 1950 and March 1993 were responsible for over 300 deaths each.

In December 1960 a nor'easter caused at least 286 deaths in the Northeastern United States, one of the deadliest nor'easters on record. 62 years later in 2022, a winter storm caused $8.5 billion in damages and 106 deaths across the United States and Canada.

In September 1954, the extratropical remnants of Typhoon Marie caused the Tōya Maru to run aground and capsize in the Tsugaru Strait. 1,159 out of the 1,309 on board were killed, making it one of the deadliest typhoons in Japanese history. In July 2016, a cyclone in Northern China left 184 dead, 130 missing, and caused over $4.96 billion in damages.

The intensity of many pre-20th century extratropical storms have been assessed by modern paleotempestological methods. These methods involve cross-referencing environmental and historical records, and have highlighted a number of especially intense cyclones in Western Europe in 1351-1352, 1469, 1645, 1711 and 1751, each of which caused severe damage and long-lasting flooding along much of Europe's coastline.

== Storm records ==
The October 2022 Southern Ocean cyclone, the most intense extratropical cyclone on record

The most intense extratropical cyclone on record was a cyclone in the Southern Ocean in October 2022. An analysis by the European Centre for Medium-Range Weather Forecasts estimated a pressure of 900.7 mbar (26.60 inHg) and a subsequent analysis published in Geophysical Research Letters estimated a pressure of 899.91 mbar (26.574 inHg). The same Geophysical Research Letters article notes at least five other extratropical cyclones in the Southern Ocean with a pressure under 915 mbar (27.0 inHg).

In the North Atlantic Ocean, the most intense extratropical cyclone was the Braer Storm, which reached a pressure of 914 mbar (27.0 inHg) in early January 1993. Before the Braer Storm, an extratropical cyclone near Greenland in December 1986 reached a minimum pressure of at least 916 mbar (27.0 inHg). The West German Meteorological Service marked a pressure of 915 mbar (27.0 inHg), with the possibility of a pressure between 912–913 mbar (26.9–27.0 inHg), lower than the Braer Storm.

The most intense extratropical cyclone across the North Pacific Ocean occurred in November 2014, when a cyclone partially related to Typhoon Nuri reached a record low pressure of 920 mbar (27 inHg). In October 2021, the most intense Pacific Northwest windstorm occurred off the coast of Oregon, peaking with a pressure of 942 mbar (27.8 inHg). One of the strongest nor'easters occurred in January 2018, in which a cyclone reached a pressure of 950 mbar (28 inHg).

== See also ==
- Nor'easter
- Sudestada
- Cyclogenesis
- Explosive cyclogenesis
- Cyclolysis
- Late December 1999 European storms
