= Meiyu front =

Weather system

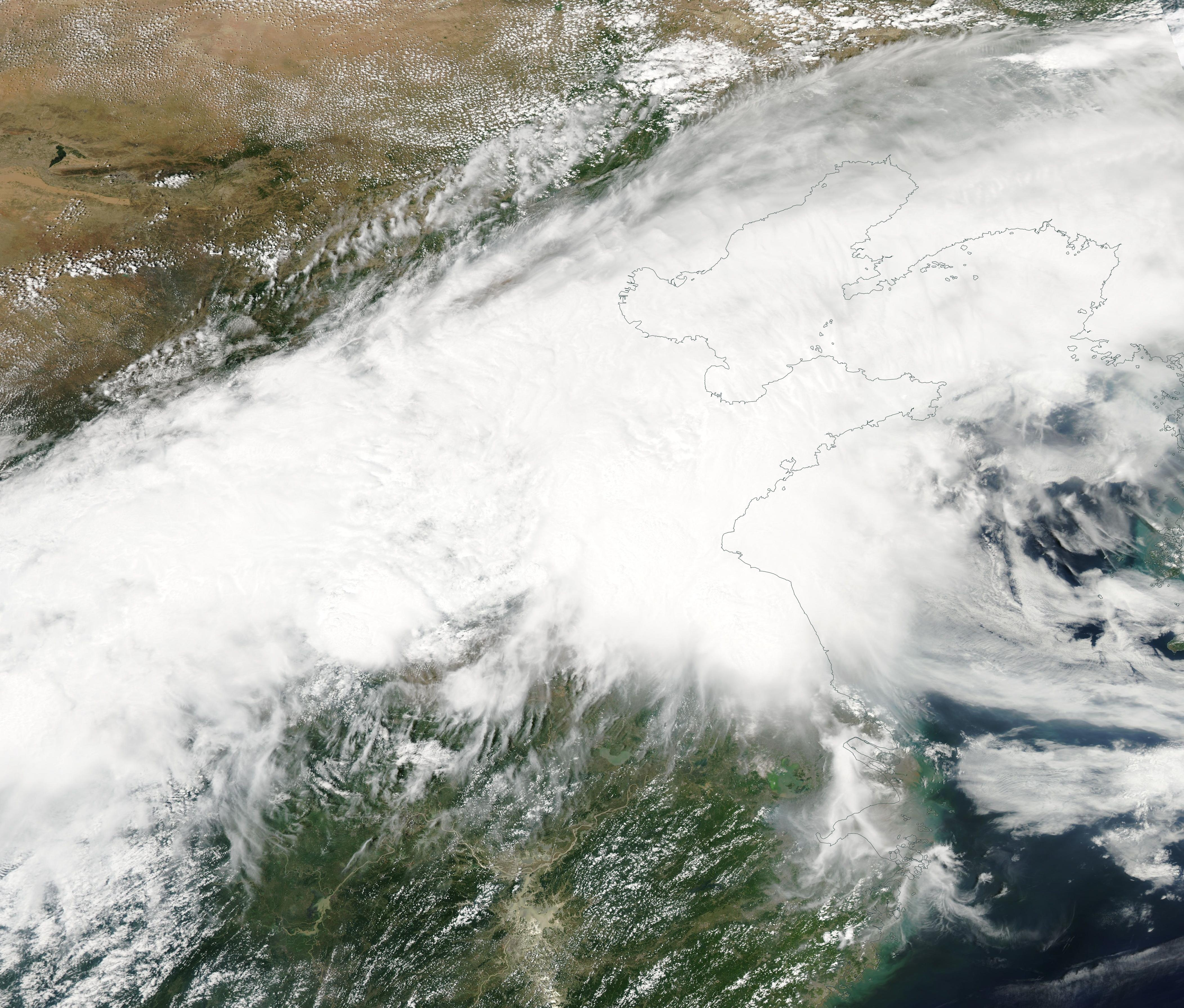
Clouds associated with the meiyu during the 2016 Jiangsu tornado

The meiyu front, also known as baiu front, is a persistent nearly stationary weak baroclinic zone in the lower troposphere. It is located over the east coast of China and Taiwan at its western end, and over the Pacific Ocean south of Japan at its eastern end.

The term meiyu (mei-yu) is Chinese for "plum rains", pronounced baiu (bai-u) in Japanese (Chinese and Japanese: 梅雨).

== Description ==
The meiyu front stretches from the Tibetan Plateau to Japan along a confluent jet stream that separates Arctic circulation to the north from tropical circulation to the south. During mid-spring to mid-summer, the upper circulation is typically west–east and the front is mostly stationary.

Along this boundary, mesoscale convective complexes (MCCs) or mesoscale convective systems (MCSs) tend to form and propagate eastward, giving a series of heavy downpours.

The system extracts moisture from the South China Sea and sometimes the Bay of Bengal. The low-level warm air is lifted by the low level jet on the equator side of the baroclinic zone. The deep vertical motion giving birth to organized MCCs/MCSs is especially strong when the low-level warm air enters the area situated beneath the jet entrance region aloft. Rainfall along this boundary tends to be particularly heavy in post-El Niño summers, such as the summer of 2016.

== See also ==
- East Asian rainy season
