= Cyclone Zorbas =

2018 Mediterranean tropical-like cyclone

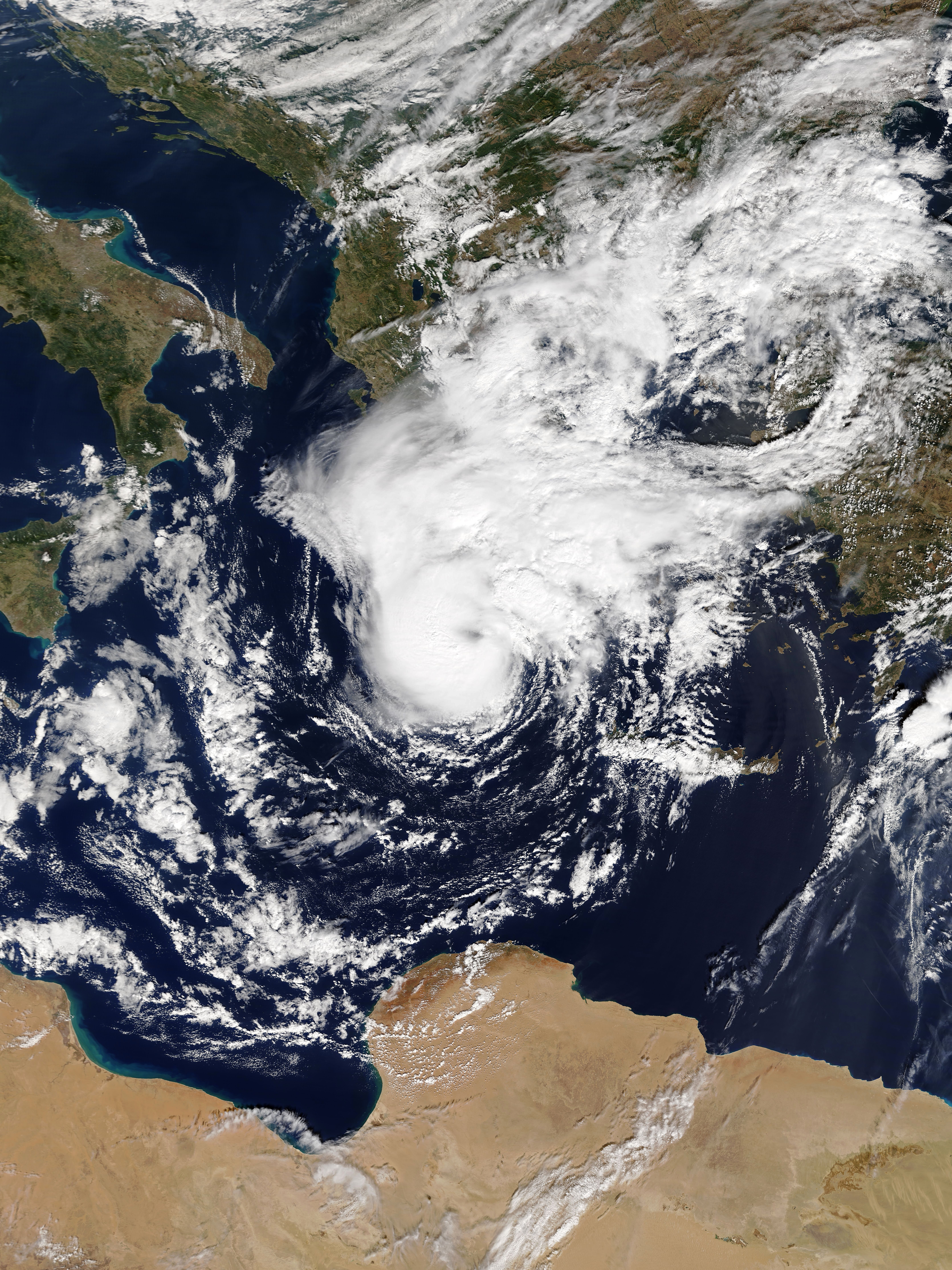
- Zorbas at peak intensity over the Ionian Sea

Meteorological history
- Formed: 27 September 2018
- Dissipated: 2 October 2018

Category 1-equivalent tropical cyclone
- 1-minute sustained (SSHWS)
- Highest winds: 120 km/h (75 mph)
- Highest gusts: 120 km/h (75 mph)
- Lowest pressure: 987 hPa (mbar); 29.15 inHg

Overall effects
- Fatalities: 6 dead, 2 missing
- Damage: > $1 million (2018 USD)
- Areas affected: Tunisia, Libya, Italy, Greece, Turkey

Cyclone Zorbas, or Medicane Zorbas, was the first officially documented Mediterranean tropical-like cyclone, or medicane, since Cyclone Numa in 2017. Zorbas originated as an extratropical cyclone in the eastern Mediterranean Sea. Warm sea surface temperatures allowed the system to quickly deepen and transition into a tropical cyclone. Zorbas intensified as it headed northward towards Greece, finally reaching its peak intensity with maximum sustained winds of 120 km/h (75 mph) and a minimum central pressure of 987 mbar (29.15 inHg) on September 29.

Heavy rain and flash flooding from Zorbas killed 5 people in Tunisia. One person was killed and two were declared missing in Greece. The storm was estimated to have caused millions of dollars (2018 USD) in damages.

== Meteorological history ==
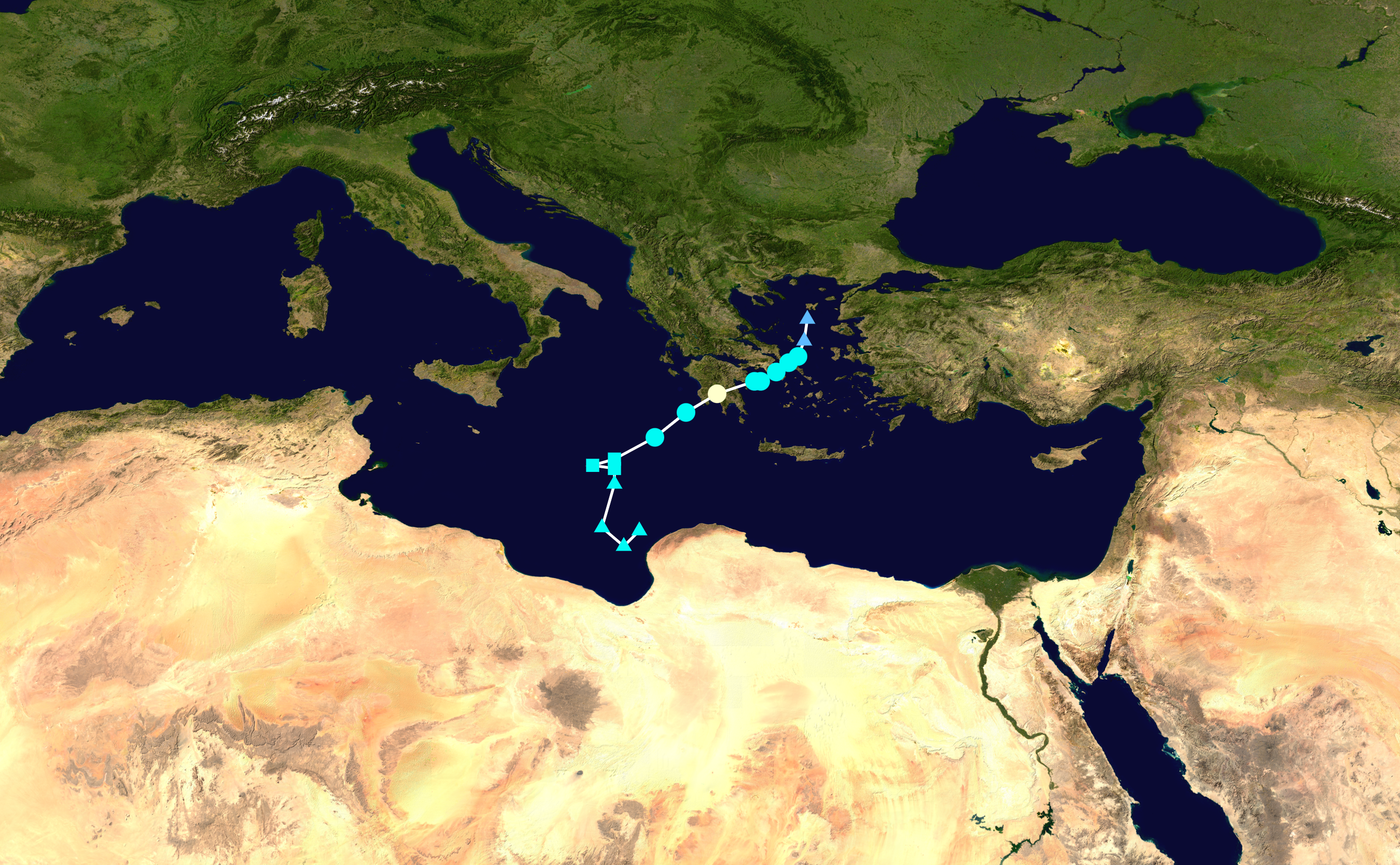
Map plotting the storm's track and intensity, according to the Saffir–Simpson scale Map key Saffir–Simpson scale Tropical depression (≤38 mph, ≤62 km/h) Tropical storm (39–73 mph, 63–118 km/h) Category 1 (74–95 mph, 119–153 km/h) Category 2 (96–110 mph, 154–177 km/h) Category 3 (111–129 mph, 178–208 km/h) Category 4 (130–156 mph, 209–251 km/h) Category 5 (≥157 mph, ≥252 km/h) Unknown Storm type Tropical cyclone Subtropical cyclone Extratropical cyclone, remnant low, tropical disturbance, or monsoon depression

A first outlook about the possible development of a shallow warm-core cyclone in the Mediterranean was issued by ESTOFEX on 25 September 2018, and a second extended outlook was issued on 26 September 2018. On 27 September 2018, an extratropical storm developed in the eastern Mediterranean Sea. Water temperatures of around 27 °C (81 °F) supported the storm's transition into a hybrid cyclone, with a warm thermal core in the center. The storm moved northeastward toward Greece, gradually intensifying and developing characteristics of a tropical cyclone. On September 29, the storm made landfall at peak intensity in the Peloponnese, west of Kalamata, where a minimum central pressure of 989.3 mbar (29.21 inHg) was reported. ESTOFEX reported on Zorbas as "Mediterranean Cyclone 2018M02", with the same pressure of 989 mbar (29.2 inHg) at Kalamata, further estimating the minimum central pressure of the cyclone to be 987 mbar (29.1 inHg), with one-minute maximum sustained winds of 120 km/h (75 mph) and a Dvorak number of T4.0, which all translate into marginal Category 1 hurricane characteristics for the cyclone. Early on 1 October, Zorbas emerged into the Aegean Sea, while accelerating northeastward. On 2 October, Zorbas moved over northwestern Turkey and dissipated. A cold wake was observed in the Mediterranean Sea, with sea surface temperatures dropping 3–4 °C (5–7 °F) along the track of Zorbas due to strong upwelling.

It is unknown who named the system Zorbas, but the name is officially recognized for a medicane by the Deutscher Wetterdienst.

== Effects ==
=== Greece ===
An indoor basketball stadium in Artemida, Attica, sustained damage to its roof during the storm, forcing the postponement of a game. The neighborhoods surrounding the Profitis Ilias in Mikri Mantineia were left without electricity for over 20 days after extensive damage occurred to the power grid. Strong waves damaged seaside businesses and flooded streets in Kalamata, Messinia. Traffic along coastal roads from Kalamata to Filoxenia ceased during the storm. In Navarinou, floodwaters swept chairs, tables, and umbrellas from beach vendors onto roads. In Methoni, a coastal highway and boats were damaged by high surf. Power outages occurred in Methoni, Koroni and Finikounda; crews worked to restore electricity on 29 September. Electricity was cut in West Mani and Pylos.

The coastal village of Kiveri in Argolis, suffered severe damage as a result of strong waves from the storm and floodwaters from the overflowing Oxovrio river. A pier in the village's port suffered damage, and multiple ships sank there. Units from the Argos-Mykines municipality were dispatched to repair damage and clean up mud and debris that had been swept into the village. Several vessels sank offshore of Myloi. Severe agricultural losses occurred in the village of Skafidaki, with olives, pomegranates, oranges, and mandarins being the worst impacted. OSE lines in Mylos and Kiveri were damaged. Roadways were damaged throughout the municipality.

The second floor of the Salamina Health Center flooded in Salamina city on Salamis Island after heavy rainfall entered through the roof and walls. Furniture, medical tools, and other items were floating in the floodwaters.

Schools were closed in Karystos on 27 September. The Evripos bridge was closed on 26 September, and the Eretria-Oropos ferry was halted.

On the island of Euboea, two elderly people and a 27-year-old man went missing during the storm. Restaurants and houses were damaged by floodwaters. Firefighters answered at least 534 calls for assistance. One couple was washed away by a water current, however, they were rescued by firefighters. The Peloponnese was placed under a state of emergency.

=== Elsewhere ===
During its formative stages, the storm caused flash flooding in Tunisia and Libya. The Tunisian government pledged financial assistance to residents whose homes were damaged.

== See also ==
- Mediterranean tropical-like cyclone
- Tropical cyclones in 2018
- Tropical cyclones and climate change
- Tropical Storm Rolf (2011) – the first tropical storm in the Mediterranean to be recognized by an international agency
- Cyclone Qendresa (2014) – one of the strongest Mediterranean tropical cyclones ever recorded
- Hurricane Leslie (2018) – a cyclone in the East Atlantic that impacted Portugal as an extratropical cyclone about two weeks after Zorbas affected Greece
- Cyclone Ianos (2020) – another medicane that mainly affected Greece
