= Tropical cyclogenesis =

Development and strengthening of a tropical cyclone in the atmosphere

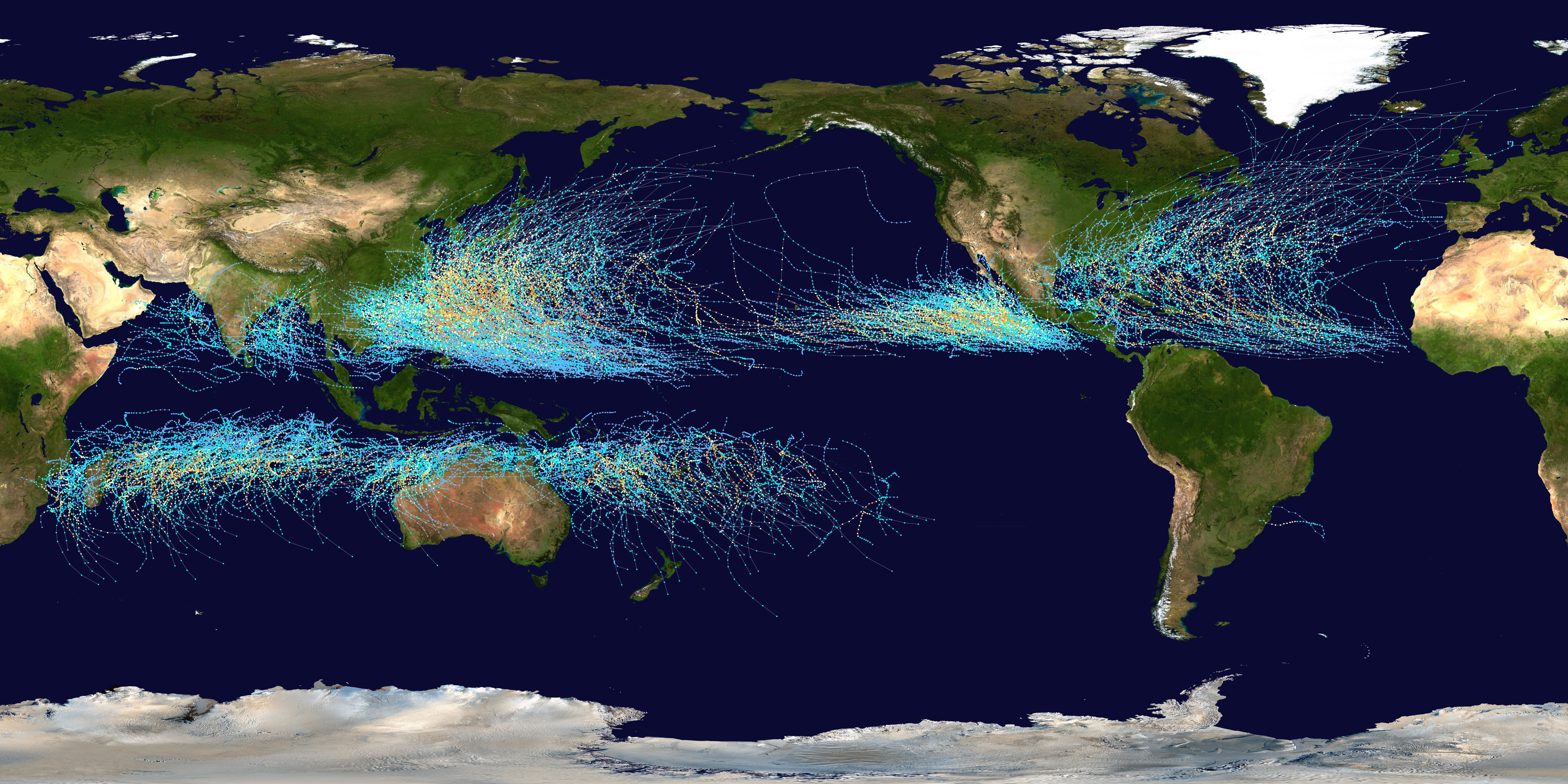
Global tropical cyclone tracks between 1985 and 2005, indicating the areas where tropical cyclones usually develop

Tropical cyclogenesis is the development and strengthening of a tropical cyclone in the atmosphere. The mechanisms through which tropical cyclogenesis occur are distinctly different from those through which temperate cyclogenesis occurs. Tropical cyclogenesis involves the development of a warm-core cyclone, due to significant convection in a favorable atmospheric environment.

Tropical cyclogenesis requires six main factors: sufficiently warm sea surface temperatures (at least 26.5 °C (79.7 °F)), atmospheric instability, high humidity in the lower to middle levels of the troposphere, enough Coriolis force to develop a low-pressure center, a pre-existing low-level focus or disturbance, and low vertical wind shear.

Tropical cyclones tend to develop during the summer, but have been noted in nearly every month in most basins. Climate cycles such as ENSO and the Madden–Julian oscillation modulate the timing and frequency of tropical cyclone development. The maximum potential intensity is a limit on tropical cyclone intensity which is strongly related to the water temperatures along its path.

An average of 86 tropical cyclones of tropical storm intensity form annually worldwide. Of those, 47 reach strengths higher than 119 km/h (74 mph), and 20 become intense tropical cyclones (at least Category 3 intensity on the Saffir–Simpson scale).

== Conditions ==
There are six main requirements for tropical cyclogenesis: sufficiently warm sea surface temperatures, atmospheric instability, high humidity in the lower to middle levels of the troposphere, enough Coriolis force to sustain a low-pressure center, a preexisting low-level focus or disturbance, and low vertical wind shear. While these conditions are necessary for tropical cyclone formation, they do not guarantee that a tropical cyclone will form.

=== Warm waters, instability, and mid-level moisture ===
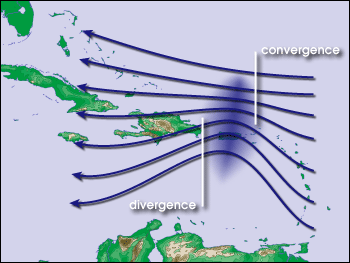
Waves in the trade winds in the Atlantic Ocean—areas of converging winds that move slowly along the same track as the prevailing wind—create instabilities in the atmosphere that may lead to the formation of hurricanes.

Normally, an ocean temperature of 26.5 °C (79.7 °F) spanning through at least a 50-metre depth is considered the minimum to maintain a tropical cyclone. These warm waters are needed to maintain the warm core that fuels tropical systems. This value is well above 16.1 °C (60.9 °F), the global average surface temperature of the oceans.

Tropical cyclones are known to form even when normal conditions are not met. For example, cooler air temperatures at a higher altitude (e.g., at the 500 hPa level, or 5.9 km) can lead to tropical cyclogenesis at lower water temperatures, as a certain lapse rate is required to force the atmosphere to be unstable enough for convection. In a moist atmosphere, this lapse rate is 6.5 °C/km, while in an atmosphere with less than 100% relative humidity, the required lapse rate is 9.8 °C/km.

At the 500 hPa level, the air temperature averages −7 °C (19 °F) within the tropics, but air in the tropics is normally dry at this level, giving the air room to wet-bulb, or cool as it moistens, to a more favorable temperature that can then support convection. A wet-bulb temperature at 500 hPa in a tropical atmosphere of −13.2 °C (8.2 °F) is required to initiate convection if the water temperature is 26.5 °C, and this temperature requirement increases or decreases proportionally by 1 °C (1.8 °F) in the sea surface temperature for each 1 °C change at 500 hpa. Under a cold cyclone, 500 hPa temperatures can fall as low as −30 °C (−22 °F), which can initiate convection even in the driest atmospheres. This also explains why moisture in the mid-levels of the troposphere, roughly at the 500 hPa level, is normally a requirement for development. However, when dry air is found at the same height, temperatures at 500 hPa need to be even colder as dry atmospheres require a greater lapse rate for instability than moist atmospheres. At heights near the tropopause, the 30-year average temperature (as measured in the period encompassing 1961 through 1990) was −77 °C (−107 °F). A recent example of a tropical cyclone that maintained itself over cooler waters was Epsilon of the 2005 Atlantic hurricane season.

==== Role of Maximum Potential Intensity (MPI) ====
Kerry Emanuel created a mathematical model around 1988 to compute the upper limit of tropical cyclone intensity based on sea surface temperature and atmospheric profiles from the latest global model runs. Emanuel's model is called the maximum potential intensity, or MPI. Maps created from this equation show regions where tropical storm and hurricane formation is possible, based upon the thermodynamics of the atmosphere at the time of the last model run. This does not take into account vertical wind shear.

=== Coriolis force ===
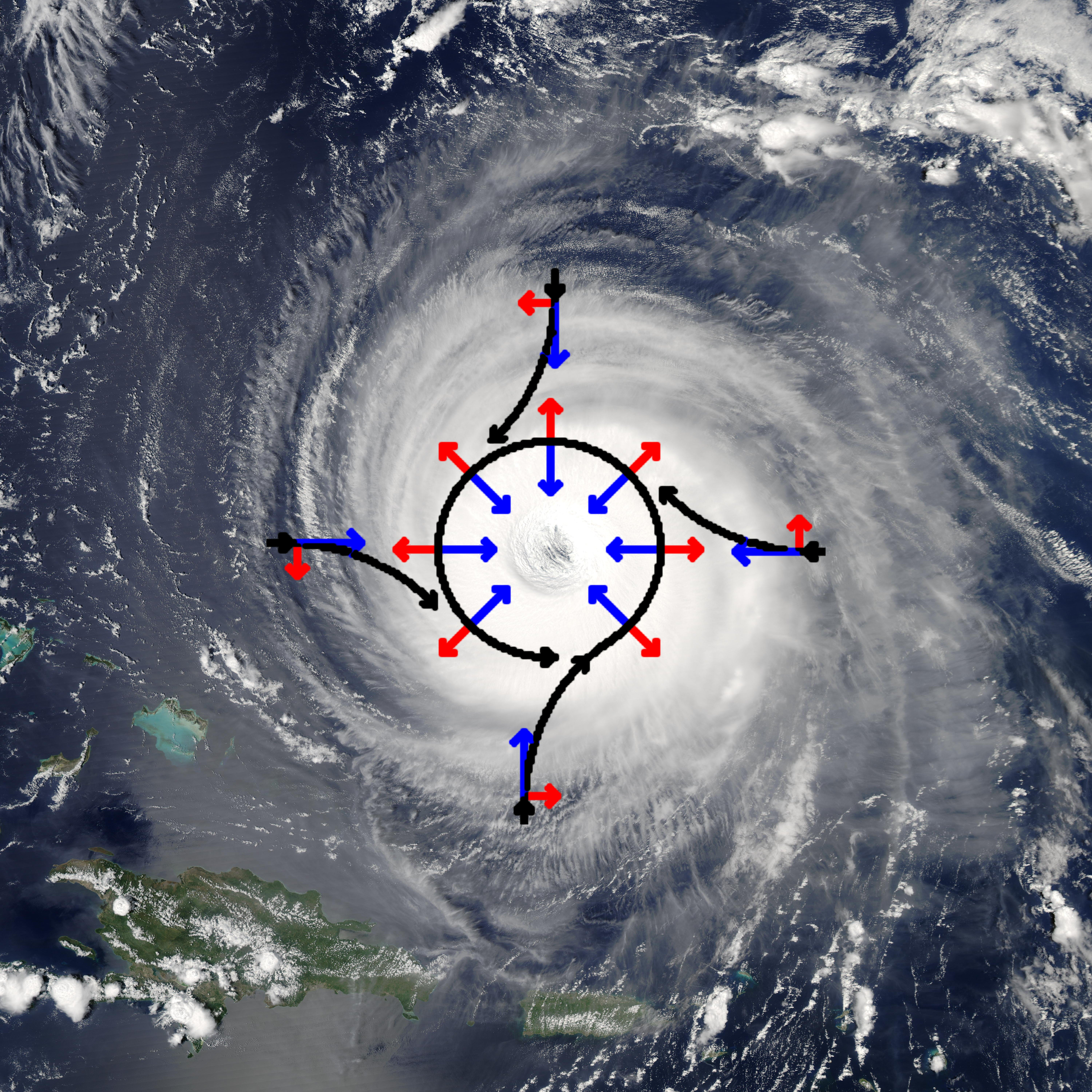
Schematic representation of flow around a low-pressure area (in this case, Hurricane Isabel) in the Northern hemisphere. The pressure gradient force is represented by blue arrows, the Coriolis acceleration (always perpendicular to the velocity) by red arrows

A minimum distance of 500 km (310 mi) from the equator (about 4.5 degrees from the equator) is normally needed for tropical cyclogenesis. The Coriolis force imparts rotation on the flow and arises as winds begin to flow in toward the lower pressure created by the pre-existing disturbance. In areas with a very small or non-existent Coriolis force (e.g. near the Equator), the only significant atmospheric forces in play are the pressure gradient force (the pressure difference that causes winds to blow from high to low pressure) and a smaller friction force; these two alone would not cause the large-scale rotation required for tropical cyclogenesis. The existence of a significant Coriolis force allows the developing vortex to achieve gradient wind balance. This is a balance condition found in mature tropical cyclones that allows latent heat to concentrate near the storm core; this results in the maintenance or intensification of the vortex if other development factors are neutral.

=== Low level disturbance ===
Whether it be a depression in the Intertropical Convergence Zone (ITCZ), a tropical wave, a broad surface front, or an outflow boundary, a low-level feature with sufficient vorticity and convergence is required to begin tropical cyclogenesis. Even with perfect upper-level conditions and the required atmospheric instability, the lack of a surface focus will prevent the development of organized convection and a surface low. Tropical cyclones can form when smaller circulations within the Intertropical Convergence Zone come together and merge.

=== Weak vertical wind shear ===
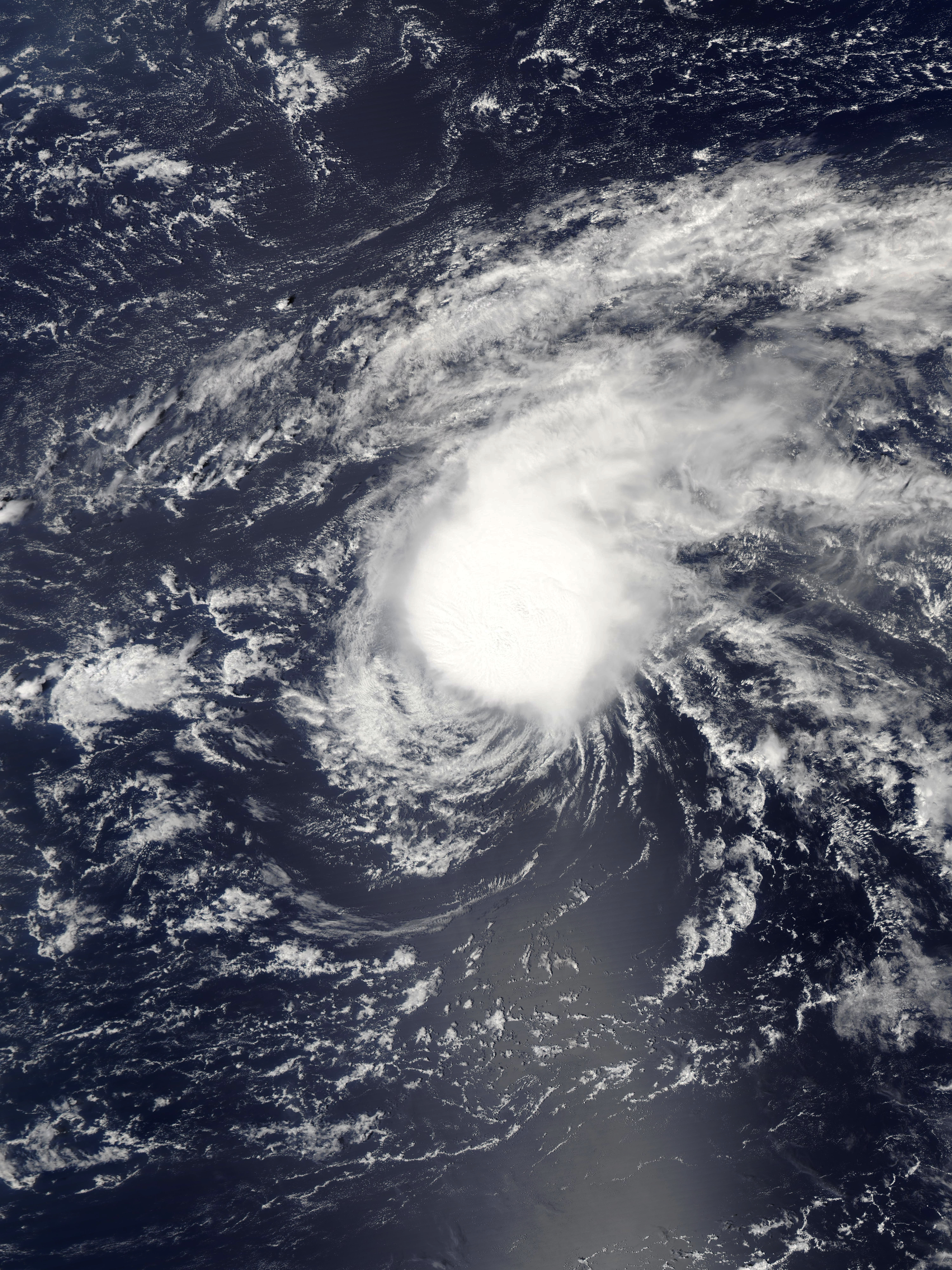
Tropical Storm Paulette in 2020, with its low-level centre partially exposed due to strong wind shear.

Vertical wind shear of less than 10 m/s (20 kt, 22 mph) between the surface and the tropopause is favored for tropical cyclone development. Weaker vertical shear makes the storm grow faster vertically into the air, which helps the storm develop and become stronger. If the vertical shear is too strong, the storm cannot rise to its full potential and its energy becomes spread out over too large of an area for the storm to strengthen. Strong wind shear can "blow" the tropical cyclone apart, as it displaces the mid-level warm core from the surface circulation and dries out the mid-levels of the troposphere, halting development. In smaller systems, the development of a significant mesoscale convective complex in a sheared environment can send out a large enough outflow boundary to destroy the surface cyclone. Moderate wind shear can lead to the initial development of the convective complex and surface low similar to the mid-latitudes, but it must diminish to allow tropical cyclogenesis to continue.

=== Favorable trough interactions ===
Limited vertical wind shear can be positive for tropical cyclone formation. When an upper-level trough or upper-level low is roughly the same scale as the tropical disturbance, the system can be steered by the upper level system into an area with better diffluence aloft, which can cause further development. Weaker upper cyclones are better candidates for a favorable interaction. There is evidence that weakly sheared tropical cyclones initially develop more rapidly than non-sheared tropical cyclones, although this comes at the cost of a peak in intensity with much weaker wind speeds and higher minimum pressure. This process is also known as baroclinic initiation of a tropical cyclone. Trailing upper cyclones and upper troughs can cause additional outflow channels and aid in the intensification process. Developing tropical disturbances can help create or deepen upper troughs or upper lows in their wake due to the outflow jet emanating from the developing tropical disturbance/cyclone.

There are cases where large, mid-latitude troughs can help with tropical cyclogenesis when an upper-level jet stream passes to the northwest of the developing system, which will aid divergence aloft and inflow at the surface, spinning up the cyclone. This type of interaction is more often associated with disturbances already in the process of recurvature.

== Times of formation ==
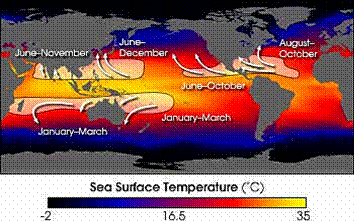
Peaks of activity worldwide

Worldwide, tropical cyclone activity peaks in late summer when water temperatures are warmest. Each basin, however, has its own seasonal patterns. On a worldwide scale, May is the least active month, while September is the most active.

In the North Atlantic, a distinct hurricane season occurs from June 1 through November 30, sharply peaking from late August through October. The statistical peak of the North Atlantic hurricane season is September 10. The Northeast Pacific has a broader period of activity, but in a similar time frame to the Atlantic. The Northwest Pacific sees tropical cyclones year-round, with a minimum in February and a peak in early September. In the North Indian basin, storms are most common from April to December, with peaks in May and November.

In the Southern Hemisphere, tropical cyclone activity generally occurs between early November and April 30. Southern Hemisphere activity peaks in mid-February to early March. Virtually all the Southern Hemisphere activity is seen from the southern African coast eastward, toward South America. Tropical cyclones are rare events across the south Atlantic Ocean and the far southeastern Pacific Ocean.

Season lengths and averages
Basin	Season start	Season end	Tropical cyclones	Refs
North Atlantic	June 1	November 30	14.4	
Eastern Pacific	May 15	November 30	16.6	
Western Pacific	January 1	December 31	26.0	
North Indian	January 1	December 31	12	
South-West Indian	July 1	June 30	9.3	
Australian region	November 1	April 30	11.0	
Southern Pacific	November 1	April 30	7.1	
Total:			96.4	

== Unusual areas of formation ==
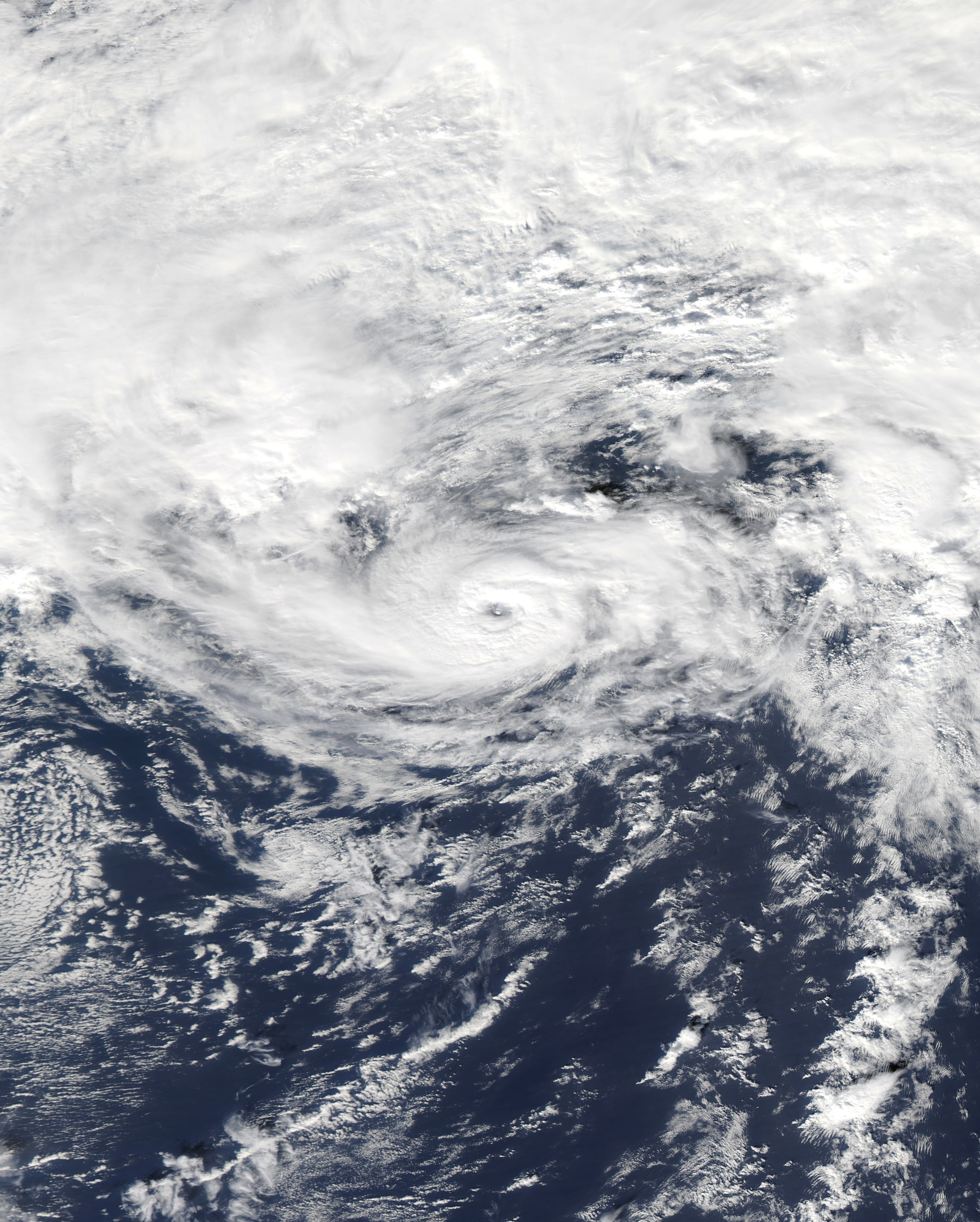
Hurricane Pablo formed in the extreme northeastern Atlantic during the 2019 season.

=== Middle latitudes ===
Areas farther than 30 degrees from the equator (except in the vicinity of a warm current) are not normally conducive to tropical cyclone formation or strengthening, and areas more than 40 degrees from the equator are often very hostile to such development. The primary limiting factor is water temperatures, although higher shear at increasing latitudes is also a factor. These areas are sometimes frequented by cyclones moving poleward from tropical latitudes. On rare occasions, such as Pablo in 2019, Alex in 2004, Alberto in 1988, and the 1975 Pacific Northwest hurricane, storms may form or strengthen in this region. Typically, tropical cyclones will undergo extratropical transition after recurving polewards, and typically become fully extratropical after reaching 45–50° of latitude. The majority of extratropical cyclones tend to restrengthen after completing the transition period.

=== Near the Equator ===
Areas within approximately ten degrees latitude of the equator do not experience a significant Coriolis force, a vital ingredient in tropical cyclone formation. However, a few tropical cyclones have been observed forming within five degrees of the equator.

=== South Atlantic ===
A combination of wind shear and a lack of tropical disturbances from the Intertropical Convergence Zone (ITCZ) makes it very difficult for the South Atlantic to support tropical activity. At least six tropical cyclones have been observed here, including a weak tropical storm in 1991 off the coast of Africa near Angola, Hurricane Catarina in March 2004, which made landfall in Brazil at Category 2 strength, Tropical Storm Anita in March 2010, Tropical Storm Iba in March 2019, Tropical Storm 01Q in February 2021, and Tropical Storm Akará in February 2024.

=== Mediterranean and Black Seas ===
Cyclonic storms with tropical-like characteristics sometimes occur in the Mediterranean Sea. Notable examples of these "Mediterranean tropical cyclones" include an unnamed system in September 1969, Leucosia in 1982, Celeno in 1995, Cornelia in 1996, Querida in 2006, Rolf in 2011, Qendresa in 2014, Numa in 2017, Ianos in 2020, Daniel in 2023, and Samuel in 2026.

The Black Sea has, on occasion, produced or fueled storms that begin cyclonic rotation, and that appear to be similar to tropical-like cyclones observed in the Mediterranean. According to an ESSL study, two of these storms reached tropical storm and subtropical storm intensity in August 2002 and September 2005 respectively.

=== Southeast Pacific ===
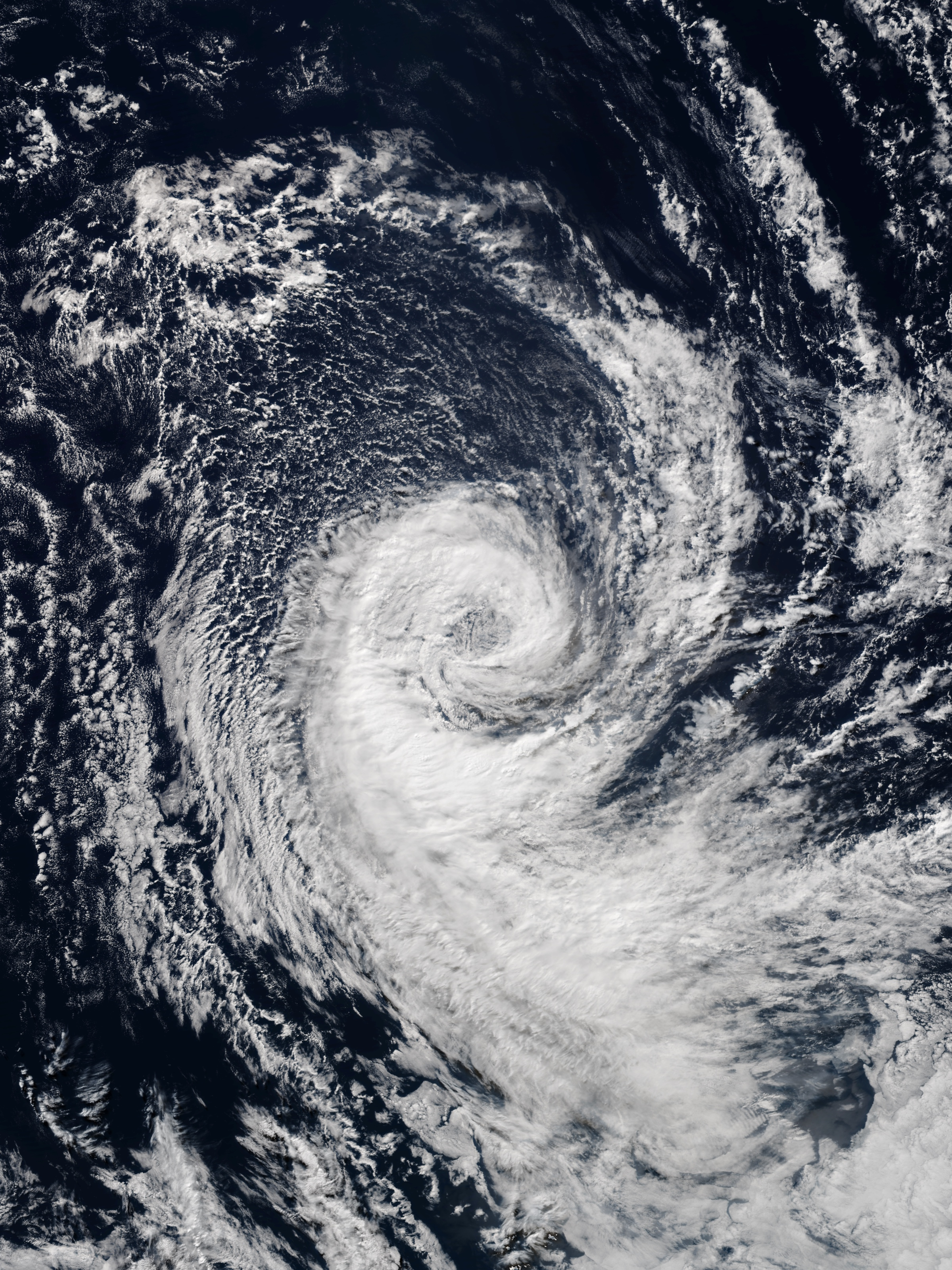
Cyclone Katie in the Southeast Pacific on May 2, 2015

Tropical cyclogenesis is extremely rare in the far southeastern Pacific Ocean, due to the cold sea-surface temperatures generated by the Humboldt Current, and also due to unfavorable wind shear; as such, Cyclone Yaku in March 2023 is the only known instance of a tropical cyclone impacting western South America. Besides Yaku, there have been several other systems that have been observed developing in the region east of 120°W, which is the official eastern boundary of the South Pacific basin. On May 11, 1983, a tropical depression developed near 110°W, which was thought to be the easternmost forming South Pacific tropical cyclone ever observed in the satellite era. In mid-2015, a rare subtropical cyclone was identified in early May, slightly near Chile, even further east than the 1983 tropical depression. This system was unofficially dubbed Katie by researchers. Another subtropical cyclone was identified at 77.8 degrees longitude west in May 2018, just off the coast of Chile. This system was unofficially named Lexi by researchers. A subtropical cyclone was spotted just off the Chilean coast in January 2022, named Humberto by researchers.

=== Elsewhere ===
A storm system that may have been a subtropical or tropical cyclone intensified off the west coast of Morocco in October 1997. The cyclone reached peak intensity off the southern coast of Portugal as it maintained an eye-like feature on October 6, 1997, before ultimately crossing the Strait of Gibraltar the next day as a decaying storm and dissipating not long after. An ESSL study on tropical and subtropical cyclones in the waters off the coast of Europe indicated that this storm may have been a minimal hurricane with sustained winds of around 75 mph (120 km/h). Another cyclonic storm with an eye-like feature occurred off the west coast of Morocco on February 18, 2002. However, the degree at which it was tropical in character is debatable, although it was likened to a medicane.

Tropical cyclogenesis is exceedingly rare in the Great Lakes. However, a storm system that appeared similar to a subtropical or tropical cyclone formed in September 1996 over Lake Huron. The system developed an eye-like structure in its center, and it may have briefly been a subtropical or tropical cyclone.

A highly rare subtropical cyclone formed south of Australia that eventually made landfall south of Adelaide on July 14, 2008.

=== Inland intensification ===
Tropical cyclones typically begin to weaken immediately following and sometimes even prior to landfall as they lose the sea fueled heat engine and friction slows the winds. However, under some circumstances, tropical or subtropical cyclones may maintain or even increase their intensity for several hours in what is known as the brown ocean effect. This is most likely to occur with warm moist soils or marshy areas, with warm ground temperatures and flat terrain, and when upper level support remains conducive.

== Influence of large-scale climate cycles ==
=== Influence of ENSO ===
Loop of sea surface temperature (SST) anomalies in the Tropical Pacific

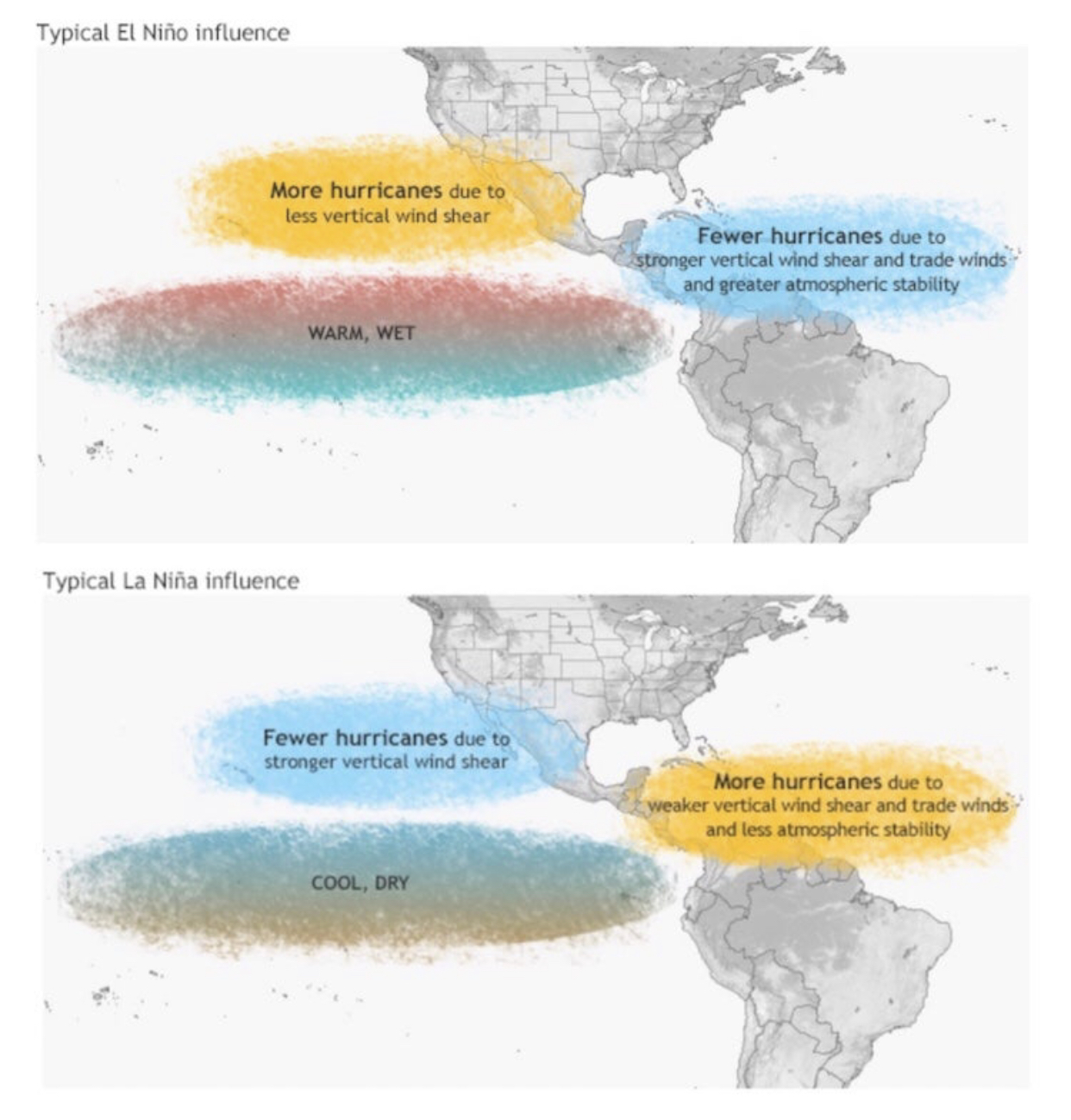
ENSO effects on hurricanes distribution.

El Niño (ENSO) shifts the region (warmer water, up and down welling at different locations, due to winds) in the Pacific and Atlantic where more storms form, resulting in nearly constant accumulated cyclone energy (ACE) values in any one basin. The El Niño event typically decreases hurricane formation in the Atlantic, and far western Pacific and Australian regions, but instead increases the odds in the central North and South Pacific and particular in the western North Pacific typhoon region.

Tropical cyclones in the northeastern Pacific and north Atlantic basins are both generated in large part by tropical waves from the same wave train.

In the Northwestern Pacific, El Niño shifts the formation of tropical cyclones eastward. During El Niño episodes, tropical cyclones tend to form in the eastern part of the basin, between 150°E and the International Date Line (IDL). Coupled with an increase in activity in the North-Central Pacific (IDL to 140°W) and the South-Central Pacific (east of 160°E), there is a net increase in tropical cyclone development near the International Date Line on both sides of the equator. While there is no linear relationship between the strength of an El Niño and tropical cyclone formation in the Northwestern Pacific, typhoons forming during El Niño years tend to have a longer duration and higher intensities. Tropical cyclogenesis in the Northwestern Pacific is suppressed west of 150°E in the year following an El Niño event.

=== Influence of the MJO ===
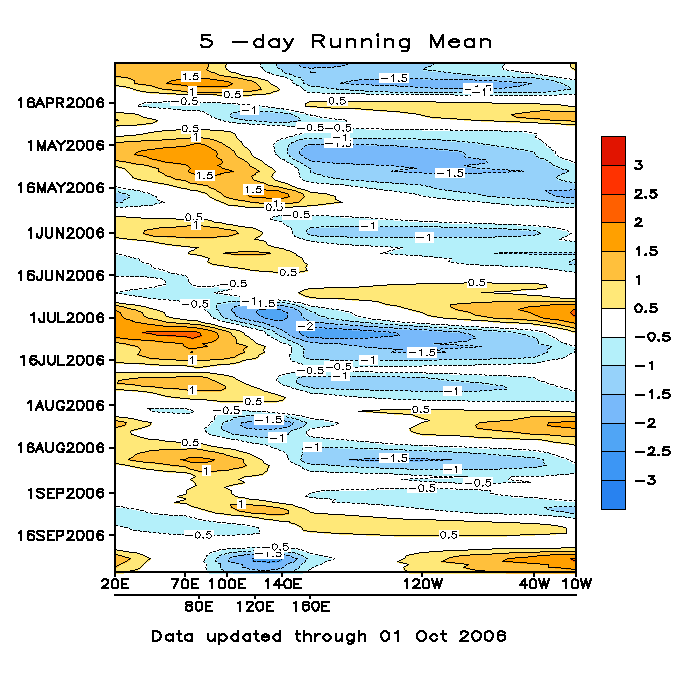
5-day running mean of MJO. Note how it moves eastward with time.

In general, westerly wind increases associated with the Madden–Julian oscillation lead to increased tropical cyclogenesis in all basins. As the oscillation propagates from west to east, it leads to an eastward march in tropical cyclogenesis with time during that hemisphere's summer season. There is an inverse relationship between tropical cyclone activity in the western Pacific basin and the north Atlantic basin, however. When one basin is active, the other is normally quiet, and vice versa. The main cause appears to be the phase of the Madden–Julian oscillation, or MJO, which is normally in opposite modes between the two basins at any given time.

=== Influence of equatorial Rossby waves ===
Research has shown that trapped equatorial Rossby wave packets can increase the likelihood of tropical cyclogenesis in the Pacific Ocean, as they increase the low-level westerly winds within that region, which then leads to greater low-level vorticity. The individual waves can move at approximately 1.8 m/s (4 mph) each, though the group tends to remain stationary.

== Seasonal forecasts ==
Since 1984, Colorado State University has been issuing seasonal tropical cyclone forecasts for the north Atlantic basin, with results that they claim are better than climatology. The university claims to have found several statistical relationships for this basin that appear to allow long range prediction of the number of tropical cyclones. Since then, numerous others have issued seasonal forecasts for worldwide basins. The predictors are related to regional oscillations in the global climate system: the Walker circulation which is related to the El Niño–Southern Oscillation; the North Atlantic oscillation (NAO); the Arctic oscillation (AO); and the Pacific North American pattern (PNA).

== See also ==
- Invest (meteorology)
- Monsoon trough
- Tropical cyclone forecasting
- Saharan air layer - dust blown from Africa over the Atlantic that mitigates hurricane formation in the Atlantic
