= Tropical Storm Rolf =

November 2011 tropical cyclone in Italy, France, Spain and Switzerland

Tropical Storm Rolf (01M)
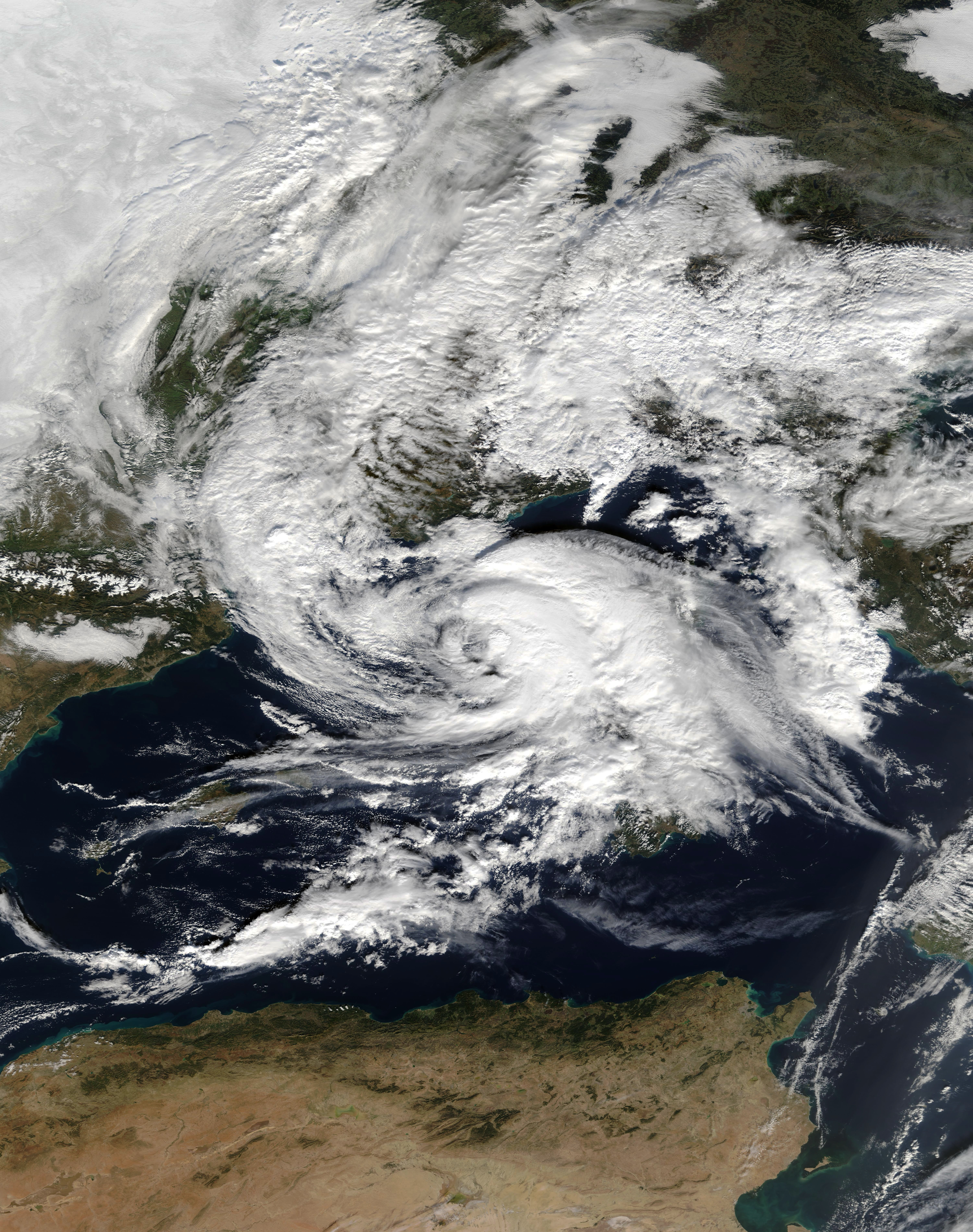
- Tropical Storm Rolf at peak intensity on 8 November

Meteorological history
- Formed: 7 November 2011
- Remnant low: 9 November 2011
- Dissipated: 10 November 2011

Tropical storm
- 1-minute sustained (SSHWS)
- Highest winds: 85 km/h (50 mph)
- Lowest pressure: 991 hPa (mbar); 29.26 inHg

Overall effects
- Fatalities: 12 total
- Damage: >$1.25 billion (2011 USD)
- Areas affected: Italy, France, Switzerland, Spain

Tropical Storm Rolf, also known as Tropical Storm 01M, was an unusual and damaging Mediterranean tropical storm that brought flooding to Italy, France, Spain, and Switzerland in November 2011. Rolf originated from an extratropical system near western France on 4 November. Despite the generally unfavorable conditions in the Mediterranean Sea, Rolf transitioned into a subtropical depression on 7 November, before becoming a tropical storm later that day. On 8 November, Rolf reached its peak intensity, with 1-minute sustained winds peaking at 85 km/h (53 mph) (Note: All values for sustained wind estimates are sustained over 1 minute, unless otherwise specified.) and a minimum central pressure of 991 mb (29.3 inHg). During the next day, the storm made landfall on the island of Île du Levant, in France, and soon afterward, near Hyères in southeastern France. Following its second landfall, Rolf quickly weakened and dissipated on 10 November. Rolf was the first tropical cyclone ever to be officially monitored by the NOAA in the Mediterranean Sea.

Rolf caused widespread flooding across southwestern Europe, especially in France and Italy, with the majority of the damage from the storm occurring in those two countries. The rainfall worsened a series of ongoing floods in Europe at the time. Torrential rainfall from Rolf caused multiple rivers to overflow their banks in France and Italy, flooding multiple cities and resulting in extensive property damage. The storm forced numerous schools and businesses to close temporarily, and also caused significant damage to 300 farms in France. Floodwaters from Rolf's rainfall also cut the power to over 8,000 customers and necessitated thousands of rescues, in addition to forcing thousands of evacuations. Rolf killed 12 people, and was at the time, the costliest Mediterranean tropical-like cyclone on record, causing at least $1.25 billion (2011 USD, €926 million) in damages. It was later surpassed by Storm Daniel in 2023. (Note: All currencies are converted to Euros using XE Currency Converter.) (Note: All currencies are in their 2011 values unless otherwise noted.)

== Meteorological history ==
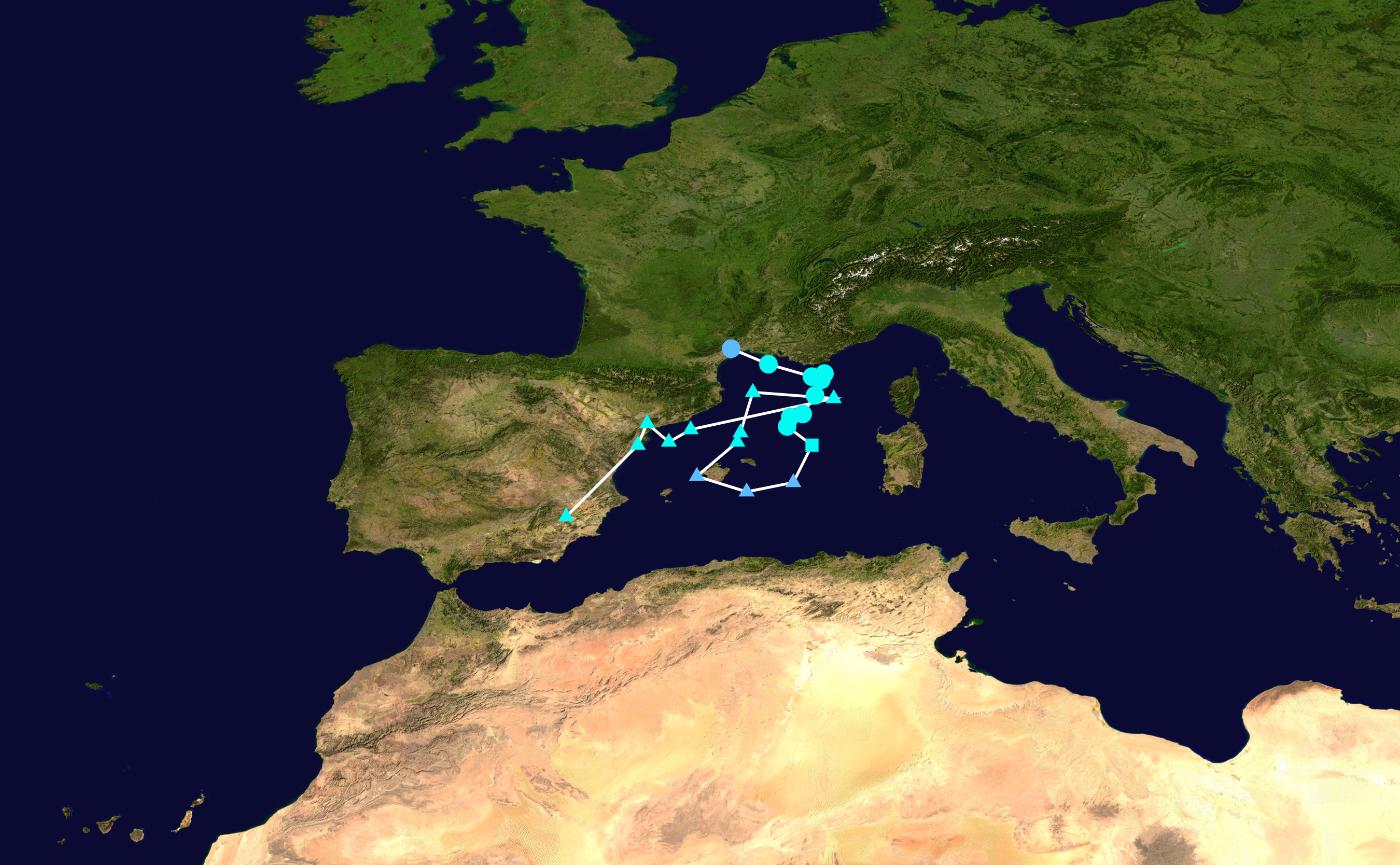
Map plotting the storm's track and intensity, according to the Saffir–Simpson scale Map key Saffir–Simpson scale Tropical depression (≤38 mph, ≤62 km/h) Tropical storm (39–73 mph, 63–118 km/h) Category 1 (74–95 mph, 119–153 km/h) Category 2 (96–110 mph, 154–177 km/h) Category 3 (111–129 mph, 178–208 km/h) Category 4 (130–156 mph, 209–251 km/h) Category 5 (≥157 mph, ≥252 km/h) Unknown Storm type Tropical cyclone Subtropical cyclone Extratropical cyclone, remnant low, tropical disturbance, or monsoon depression

In early November 2011, a large extratropical cyclone named "Quinn" moved to the northwest of the British Isles, with the storm's frontal boundary stretching southward into Western Europe. On 4 November, an extratropical disturbance was spawned over western France, near the border of Spain, within the cold front of Quinn. On the next day, the new disturbance developed a low-pressure area over western France, within the southern part of Quinn's frontal structure; the system was subsequently named Rolf by the Free University of Berlin, which names all significant low-pressure systems that affect Europe. Rolf quickly separated from Quinn, and proceeded to slowly move eastward. Rolf gradually organised and convection, or thunderstorms, associated with the storm consolidated. Over the next couple of days, Rolf continued to increase in organisation as it moved eastward. On 5 November, Rolf's forward motion slowed while the storm was situated above the Massif Central in southern France, maintaining a central pressure of 1,000 millibars (30 inHg). On 6 November, the system moved into the western Mediterranean Sea in the direction of northwestern Italy, while gradually strengthening, before turning southward. Around the same time, the storm's frontal structure shrunk to 150 kilometres (93 mi) in length. From 12:00 UTC on 6 November to 00:00 UTC on 7 November, Rolf moved across the Balearic Islands, before turning to the east and then the north, moving in a counterclockwise motion. Later on 7 November, Rolf turned westward, and slowly transitioned from an extratropical system into a subtropical depression over the abnormally-warm waters of the Mediterranean Sea, which were at 17 °C (63 °F). With this transition, Rolf acquired a warm quasi-symmetric core, and organised convective rainbands wrapped around the center of the storm. The storm was then given the designation Invest 99L, by the United States Naval Research Laboratory (NRL). The NOAA also began monitoring the subtropical depression, which was now located in the Gulf of Lion. Later that day, Rolf transitioned from a subtropical depression into a tropical depression off the coast of France, and the NOAA gave Rolf the identifier 01M.

Late on 7 November, soon after Rolf had completed its tropical transition, the system increased further in organization and strengthened significantly in the process, with the NOAA noting that deep convention had persisted around the core of Rolf long enough to officially declare the system a tropical storm. Consequently, the Satellite Services Division of NESDIS in the NOAA classified the system as Tropical Storm 01M. By then, Rolf had developed a deep warm core, while turning northeastward. On 8 November, Rolf strengthened further as it slowly approached the southeastern coast of France and the coast of Liguria, with the storm also developing an eye. At 03:00 UTC on the same day, Rolf reached its peak intensity, attaining a minimum central pressure of 991 mb (29.3 inHg) and maximum 1-minute sustained winds of 85 km/h (53 mph). Rolf began to weaken on 9 November as it approached the French coastline, due to hostile conditions, with the storm's convection decreasing and its upper- and mid-level circulation centers becoming misaligned. That same day, Rolf turned westward, just off the coast of France. Later that day, Rolf weakened into a tropical depression as the storm neared landfall in France, with the NOAA issuing their final bulletin on the storm, as Rolf was expected to dissipate soon. Later that day, Rolf made landfall on the island of Île du Levant, with a central pressure of 1,015 millibars (30.0 inHg), Soon afterward, Rolf made another landfall near Hyères, in Southeastern France, weakening rapidly upon making its second landfall. Rolf fully dissipated several hours later, early on 10 November. As a tropical system, the warm core of Rolf persisted for a longer period of time compared to most of the other documented Mediterranean tropical-like cyclones.

== Preparations and impact ==
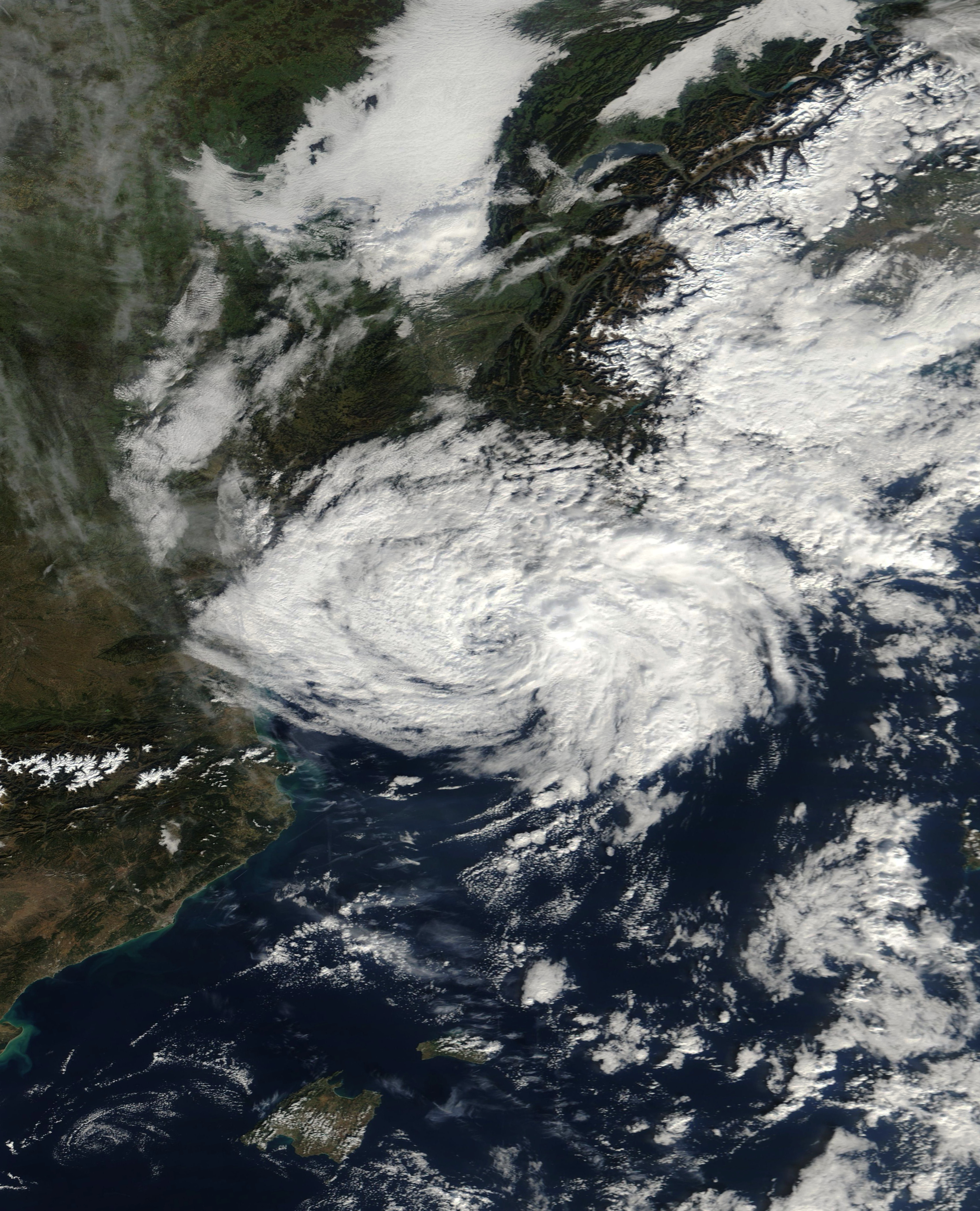
Tropical Storm Rolf about to make landfall near Hyères, France, on 9 November.

Tropical Storm Rolf caused heavy flooding across Italy, France, Spain, and Switzerland, as both an extratropical precursor and as a tropical cyclone. From 1–9 November, Storm Quinn and Rolf dropped prolific amounts of rainfall over parts of southwestern Europe (the vast majority of which came from Rolf), with a maximum total of 605 mm (23.8 in) of rain reported in France. In both France and Italy, the heavy rainfall from the storm caused many rivers to overflow their banks, resulting in multiple cities being flooded and enormous property losses ensuing. Rolf also caused heavy flooding in Spain. A total of 12 people died from the storm; seven people in Italy, and five in France. The storm caused over US$1.25 billion (€926 million) in damages.

=== Italy ===
In northern Italy, saturated grounds due to heavy rainfall from Storm Quinn in early November worsened the flooding later caused by Rolf, which began inundating the region on 4 November. In Italy, the cities that experienced the worst flooding were Genoa, Recco, Milan, Venice, and Turin, especially Genoa and Recco in Liguria. On 4 November, torrential rainfall in the region—which had begun on the day before—led to widespread flooding, killing seven people and triggering the evacuation of a few thousand people in northern Italy. The Ferregiano, a westward-flowing tributary of the Bisagno, overflowed its banks by 4 metres (13 ft). The Genoa-Sestri Levante section of Highway A12 in Italy was closed, due to the flooding, and air and rail traffic in the region were suspended. The road between Recco and Camogli was also flooded. On 5 November, lightning struck the roof of a house in Camogli, starting a fire that was quickly put out by firefighters. The storm also caused multiple small landslides and downed numerous trees in Liguria.

Flooding from Rolf also led to traffic obstructions by 6 November in Piedmont and Tigullio, in the Province of Savona, after severe thunderstorms dumped large amounts of rainfall on the night of 5–6 November. The flooding also caused blackouts in the Province of Savona on that night, and homes in the area suffered from flooded garages and basements. On the evening of 6 November, Rolf spawned a tornado over Alassio, in the Province of Savona, damaging buildings and walkways in Piazza d'Italia, and flooding basements in the village of Barusso. In Calice al Cornoviglio, chasms opened up in the roads after multiple collapses, due to damage from the floodwaters. From 6–7 November, 300 mm (12 in) of rain fell in Triora, in the Province of Imperia, which led to flooding in Sanremo that forced the evacuation of 25 families from a six-story building; a total of 40 people were evacuated. On 7 November, rainfall from Rolf caused a landslide in Savignone, which blocked Provincial Road 10. Rolf also caused a landslide in the Province of Genoa that broke the natural gas line between Casella and Montoggio, which was estimated would require four to six months to repair. In Genoa, schools closed from 5–9 November. In total, Rolf caused at least €118.4 million (US$160 million) in damages in Italy.

The Italian Government was criticized for the poor hydrogeological conditions in the city of Genova after Rolf, as well as the lack of safety measures for preventing the disaster; the aftermath led to the eruption of a political scandal.

=== France ===
Officials in France noted that 16 departments in southern France sustained severe flooding and losses from Rolf. Some of the hardest hit areas in France included Valleraugue, Sablières, Loubaresse, Draguignan, Arles, and Cannes. The region was still recovering from a prior flooding event in June 2010, 17 months ago. The Department of Var in southeastern France was severely impacted by Rolf, with the department seeing widespread flood damage and thousands of evacuations. The Alpes-Maritimes district along the Var River was also heavily impacted, with the district suffering several million Euros in damages. In the days preceding and during its landfalls, Rolf triggered floods across southern France, from the Pyrénées-Atlantiques all the way to the French–Italian border, as well as on the island of Corsica. Rolf killed a total of five people in France.

During a nine-day period, from 1–9 November, 605 mm (23.8 in) of rain fell across southern France, with 443 mm (17.4 in) of rain falling on 4–6 November alone. On 5 November, 240 mm (9.4 in) of rain fell on Caussols and 297 mm (11.7 in) of rain fell on Saint-Martin-d'Entraunes. All of the rivers in the north, west, and central regions of the Alpes-Maritimes overflowed their banks, including: the Frayère in Auribeau, the Mourachone in Pégomas, the Siagne in Mandelieu, the Brague, the Béal, the Riou, the Cagne, the Loup, the Roya, the Vaïre, and the Var. The floods forced numerous evacuations across southern France. From 5–8 November, Rolf forced the evacuation of 2,500 people in the Argens region, triggered blackouts that left 8,000 families without power, and required 1,100 rescues by French SP firefighters. During that same period of time, Rolf caused widespread traffic disruptions, triggered multiple landslides, and also flooded numerous homes and apartments. The storm damaged numerous municipal roads, wastewater treatment plants, waste reception buildings, schools, and other public buildings. The storm also damaged at least 300 businesses and 300 farms in the Var. Of the different communes in the Var, La Palud-sur-Verdon, near Fréjus, suffered the most damage. On 10 November, following the storm, 4,000 customers remained without electricity in the Var, and eight municipalities had no access to clean drinking water. In the aftermath of the storm, 36 municipalities requested the French Government to declare a state of emergency. Wind gusts between 130 and 150 km/h (81 and 93 mph) were recorded across the Var in the days leading up to Rolf's first landfall. At Île du Levant, a maximum 10-minute sustained wind speed of 110 km/h (68 mph) was recorded, while a maximum gust of 149 km/h (93 mph) was recorded at the same location. Porquerolles reported the highest wind gust from Rolf, at 154 km/h (96 mph), while the same location reported a 10-minute sustained wind speed of 104 km/h (65 mph). Rolf also generated waves up to 6 meters (20 feet) high off the coast of France, prior to making landfall.

The Caisse Centrale de Réassurance (CCR), the French state insurance company, estimated that Rolf caused around €807 million (US$1.09 billion) in insured losses in France.

=== Spain ===
Rolf brought flooding and strong winds to parts of Spain from 4 to 7 November, particularly in northern Spain, with the worst of the impacts occurring on 5–6 November. Local authorities issued weather alerts for the floods and gale-force winds that Rolf brought to the country. Basque Country, an autonomous community in northern Spain, was one of the hardest-hit regions in the country. Rolf also generated the largest rainfall event that Gipuzkoa—a province in Basque Country—had seen since 1983. Parts of the autonomous community reported a maximum total of 339.8 millimetres (13.38 in) of rainfall, and wind gusts up to 96 km/h (60 mph) were also reported in the region. In Catalonia, Rolf dropped a maximum total of 293.8 millimetres (11.57 in) of rainfall from 1 to 8 November, causing moderate flooding in the area, and cutting the power to 12,054 people in 33 municipalities. Multiple roads were flooded and some vehicles were stranded by floodwaters, leading to multiple traffic and train delays. The first floors and garages of multiple homes also flooded. The flooding in Catalonia resulted in over €1 million (US$1.344 million) in insured losses. Rolf also caused flooding in the Balearic Islands from 6 to 7 November.

== See also ==
- Mediterranean tropical-like cyclone
- Tropical cyclones in 2011
- Cyclone Qendresa (2014)
- Cyclone Numa (2017)
- Cyclone Ianos (2020)
- Unusual areas of tropical cyclone formation
- South Atlantic tropical cyclone
  - Hurricane Catarina (2004)
- 1996 Lake Huron cyclone
- 2006 Central Pacific cyclone
- Subtropical Cyclone Katie (2015)
