= Cyclone Ianos =

Mediterranean tropical-like cyclone in 2020

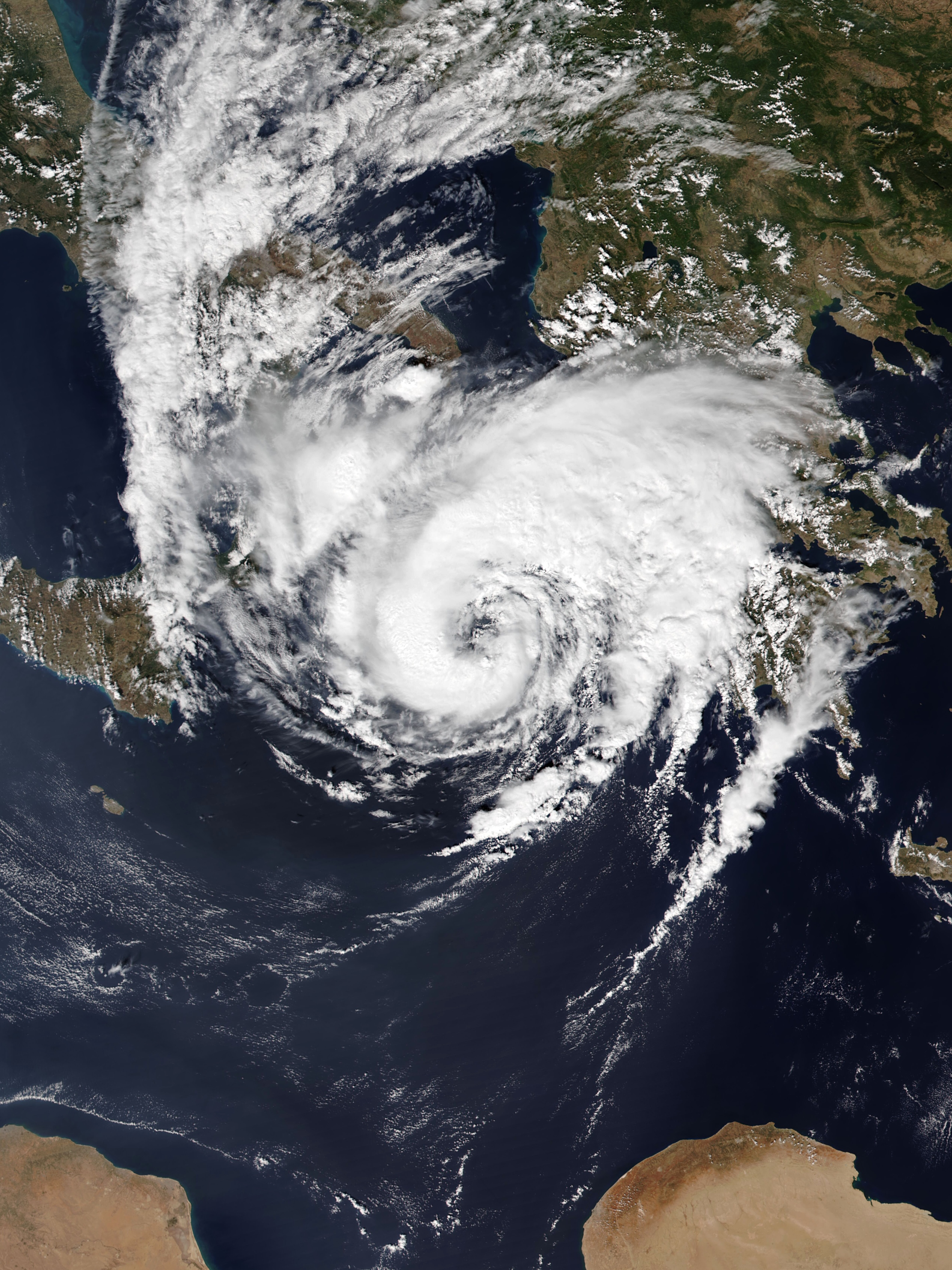
- Ianos shortly before its record peak intensity, nearing landfall in Greece on 17 September.

Meteorological history
- Formed: 14 September 2020
- Dissipated: 21 September 2020

Category 2-equivalent tropical cyclone
- 1-minute sustained (SSHWS)
- Highest winds: 155 km/h (100 mph)
- Highest gusts: 195 km/h (120 mph)
- Lowest pressure: 982 hPa (mbar); 29.00 inHg

Overall effects
- Fatalities: 4
- Missing: 1 (presumed dead)
- Damage: ≥ $100 million (2020 USD) ≥ €164 million (2020 Euro)
- Areas affected: Libya, Italy, Malta, Greece, Crete, Cyrenaica

Cyclone Ianos, also known as Medicane Ianos, was a rare medicane that impacted the eastern Mediterranean on 17 and 18 September 2020, especially Greece. Ianos developed from an area of low pressure over the Gulf of Sidra that quickly began tropical cyclogenesis while moving over warm waters. After receiving various names from different meteorological centers, the storm, dubbed Ianos by the METEO unit of the National Observatory of Athens, rapidly intensified while moving northeastward. After scraping Italy, the storm went on to strike Malta and Crete with tropical storm-force winds. Despite land interaction, the small cyclone reached its peak intensity of 159 km/h (99 mph) with wind gusts up to 195 km/h (121 mph) on 18 September, equivalent to a Category 2 hurricane on the Saffir–Simpson scale, immediately before making landfall in southwestern Greece. After landfall, Ianos turned back out to sea and moved south-southeastward, before dissipating on 21 September.

Damage was severe in Greece, with cities in the central part of the country getting the brunt of the storm's impacts. Cities such as Karditsa and Mouzaki were flooded for several days. Heavy agricultural damage was reported in rural areas north of Athens. A state of emergency was declared for the islands of Ithaca, Kefalonia, and Zakynthos. Four people were killed, and one person remains missing. Ianos caused at least $100 million (2020 USD) in damages.

== Meteorological history ==
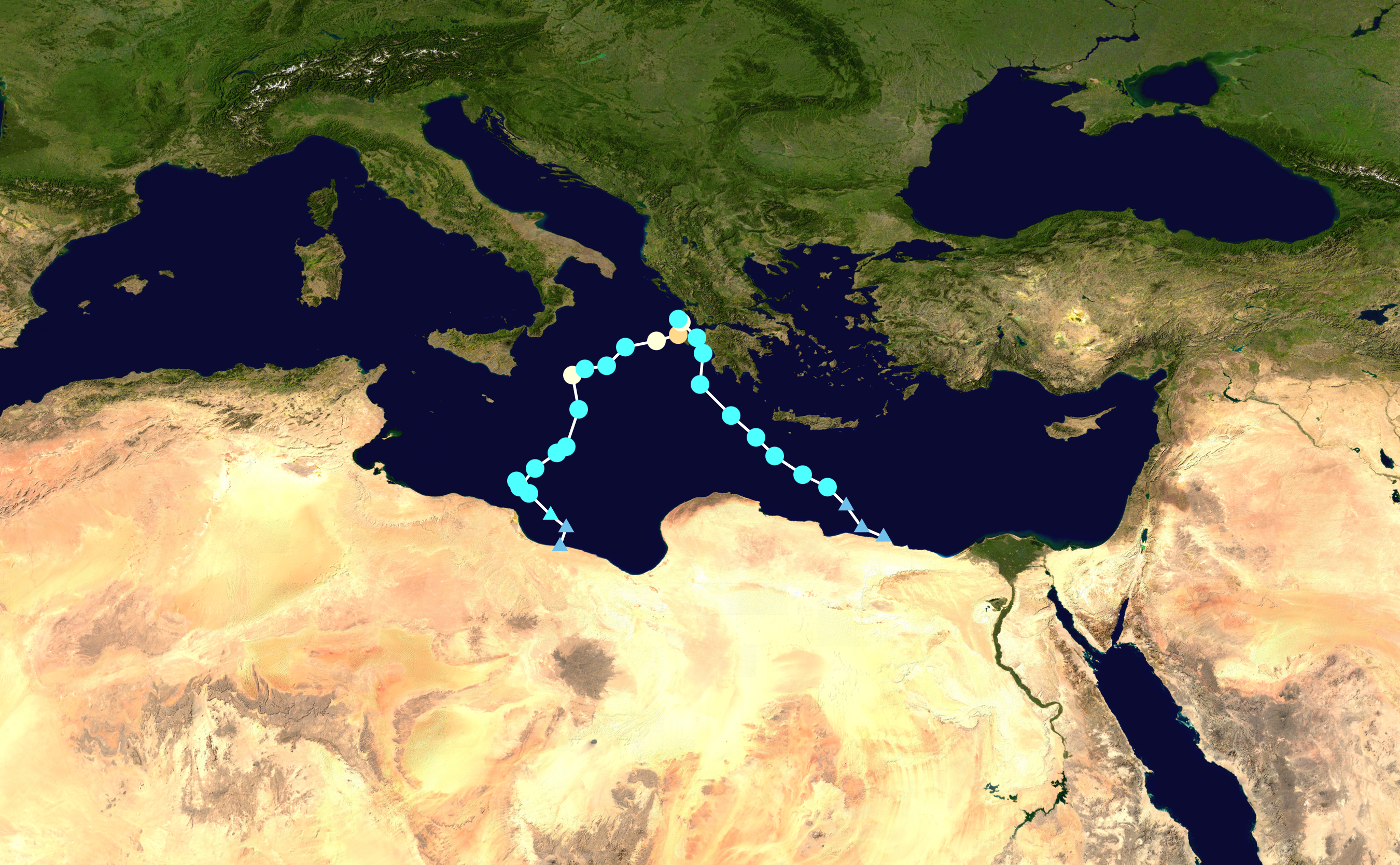
Map plotting the storm's track and intensity, according to the Saffir–Simpson scale Map key Saffir–Simpson scale Tropical depression (≤38 mph, ≤62 km/h) Tropical storm (39–73 mph, 63–118 km/h) Category 1 (74–95 mph, 119–153 km/h) Category 2 (96–110 mph, 154–177 km/h) Category 3 (111–129 mph, 178–208 km/h) Category 4 (130–156 mph, 209–251 km/h) Category 5 (≥157 mph, ≥252 km/h) Unknown Storm type Tropical cyclone Subtropical cyclone Extratropical cyclone, remnant low, tropical disturbance, or monsoon depression

An upper-level low moved eastward in the southern Mediterranean Sea through 14 September. On that day, a low-pressure area began to develop over the Gulf of Sidra, beginning tropical cyclogenesis by forming a warm core at the surface. The cyclone quickly developed in the subsequent hours while slowly moving northwest, with a wind speed of around 50 km/h (31 mph). By 15 September, it had intensified to 65 km/h (40 mph), with a minimum pressure of 1,010 hPa (30 inHg), with further development predicted over the coming days. The cyclone had strong potential to become tropical over the next several days due to warm sea temperatures of 27 to 28 °C (81 to 82 °F) in the region. Weather models predicted that it would likely hit the west coast of Greece on 17 or 18 September. Ianos gradually intensified over the Ionian Sea, acquiring an eye Ianos made landfall on Greece at peak intensity on 03:00 UTC on 18 September, with winds peaking near 159 km/h (99 mph) and a minimum central pressure estimated at 982 hPa (29.0 inHg), equivalent to a Category 2 hurricane.

After making landfall, Ianos turned south-southeastward on 19 September, moving back out to sea, where the storm managed to reorganize somewhat. Soon afterward, Ianos underwent a weakening trend. Ianos continued moving south-southeastward for another couple of days before dissipating on 21 September, off the coast of Cyrenaica.

Warmer sea surface temperatures caused by climate change in the Mediterranean Sea can allow the storms to take on more tropical appearances and characteristics, increasing the wind speeds and making the storms more intense. A 2017 study in Global and Planetary Change led by Raquel Romera examined a large suite of regional climate model projections, which supported the theory that medicanes will gradually become stronger due to climate change.

== Preparations and impact ==
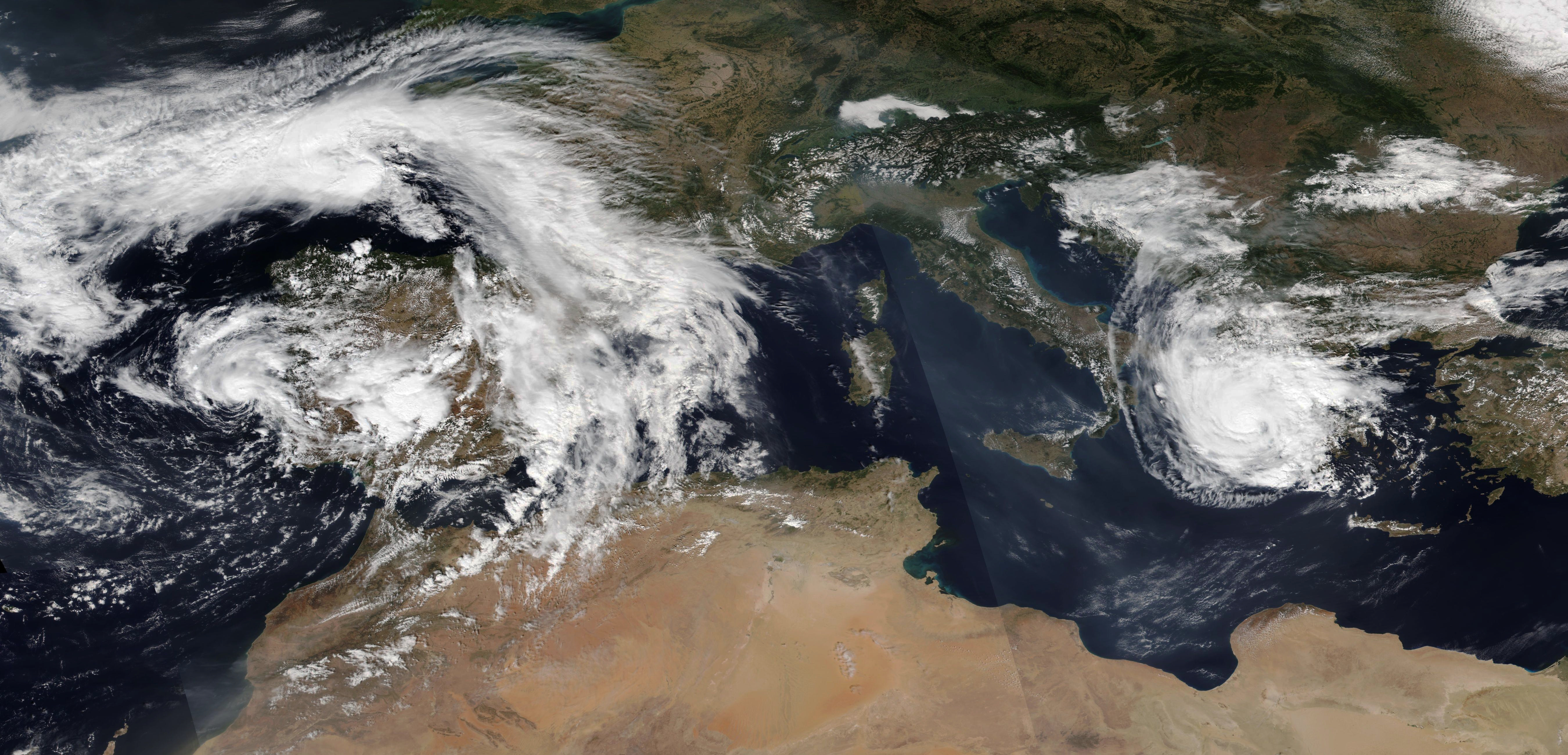
Subtropical Storm Alpha (left) and Cyclone Ianos (right) both affecting Europe on 18 September.

As Ianos passed to the south of Italy on 16 September, it produced heavy rain across the southern part of the country and in Sicily. As much as 35 mm (1.4 in) of rain was reported in Reggio Calabria, more than the city's normal monthly rainfall.

The Hellenic National Meteorological Service issued Red Alerts, the highest level of warnings, to alert people of the storm while it was approaching Greece. Downed trees and power outages were reported on Kefalonia, and residents were urged to stay indoors. Wind gusts reached 195 km/h (121 mph) on Kefalonia and Zakynthos. When Ianos stalled over the western part of Greece, it caused flash flooding and landslides. The peak official rainfall amount recorded was 644.7 mm (25.38 in), in Kefalonia. Ianos left four people dead and one missing. On 19 September, a man was found dead on his farm north of Athens, while the body of a woman was recovered from her flooded home in a nearby town. On 20 September, the body of a 62-year-old farmer was found under the collapsed roof of his house in a village north of Athens. In addition, a 43-year-old woman was found dead on 24 September after being declared missing on 20 September. The woman was swept several kilometres from her car by flash flooding. More than 5,000 homes were damaged. In addition, there were strong tides in Ionian islands such as Kefalonia, Zakynthos, Ithaca and Lefkada, and 120 km/h (75 mph) winds at Karditsa that brought down trees and power lines, and caused landslides. A bridge also collapsed in Karditsa, one of the hardest-hit areas. Throughout the country, over 600 people were rescued by the national firefighting service. Greece's cotton crop was ready for harvest, which was set to begin just as the storm hit. However, Ianos likely caused significant flooding and crop losses where rain was heaviest, especially in Thessalia. Assos, in Kefalonia, was isolated from the rest of the island and the mainland. Nearly two metres (6.6 ft) of rubble covered roads, prohibiting access by car and trapping residents and tourists. The cost of removing the rubble was estimated at more than €50,000 ($58,555 USD).

== Aftermath and naming ==
On 20 September, the Public Power Corporation reported that 61 power substations were in operation in the urban zone of Karditsa, and another 10 would be powered shortly. Efforts were made to restore power in Argithea and Mouzaki. The top officials of the corporation met with the leader of the Karditsa Fire Department to coordinate and accelerate water pumping in areas where the technical crews needed to work.

Prime Minister of Greece Kyriakos Mitsotakis pledged that "all the affected areas will have immediate support." He sent three senior officials to the worst-hit central region. On 22 September, Prime Minister Mitsotakis visited the Karditsa region, one of the hardest-hit regions. 5,000 to 8,000 euros were given to each household and business in Karditsa and Mouzaki. In Mouzaki, Mayor Fanis Stathis declared that all schools and nurseries will remain closed, as Ianos damaged the road network, and school buildings of the region.

Greece assigned the system the name "Ianos" (Ιανός), sometimes anglicized to "Janus", while the German weather service used the name "Udine"; the Turkish used "Tulpar".

== See also ==
- Mediterranean tropical-like cyclone
- Tropical cyclones in 2020
- Tropical cyclones and climate change
- Hurricane Catarina (2004) – The strongest tropical cyclone to ever occur in the South Atlantic Ocean, another unusual area of tropical cyclone formation
- Tropical Storm Rolf (2011) – The first tropical storm in the Mediterranean to be recognized by an official government agency
- Cyclone Qendresa (2014) – One of the strongest Mediterranean tropical cyclones ever recorded
- Cyclone Numa (2017) – Another powerful Medicane that affected western Greece
- Cyclone Zorbas (2018) – A powerful Medicane that also struck Greece two years before Ianos
- Subtropical Storm Alpha (2020) – A North Atlantic subtropical cyclone that coincided with Ianos and made landfall in Portugal
