= Maximum potential intensity =

Cyclone strength measure

The maximum potential intensity of a tropical cyclone is the theoretical limit of the strength of a tropical cyclone.

== Maximum potential intensity ==
Due to surface friction, the inflow only partially conserves angular momentum. Thus, the sea surface lower boundary acts as both a source (evaporation) and sink (friction) of energy for the system. This fact leads to the existence of a theoretical upper bound on the strongest wind speed that a tropical cyclone can attain. Because evaporation increases linearly with wind speed (just as climbing out of a pool feels much colder on a windy day), there is a positive feedback on energy input into the system known as the Wind-Induced Surface Heat Exchange (WISHE) feedback. This feedback is offset when frictional dissipation, which increases with the cube of the wind speed, becomes sufficiently large. This upper bound is called the "maximum potential intensity", $v_p$, and is given by

$$v_p^2 = \frac{C_k}{C_d}\frac{T_s - T_o}{T_o}\Delta k$$

where $T_s$ is the temperature of the sea surface, $T_o$ is the temperature of the outflow ([K]), $\Delta k$ is the enthalpy difference between the surface and the overlying air ([J/kg]), and $C_k$ and $C_d$ are the surface exchange coefficients (dimensionless) of enthalpy and momentum, respectively. The surface-air enthalpy difference is taken as $\Delta k = k^*_s-k$, where $k^*_s$ is the saturation enthalpy of air at sea surface temperature and sea-level pressure and $k$ is the enthalpy of boundary layer air overlying the surface.

The maximum potential intensity is predominantly a function of the background environment alone (i.e. without a tropical cyclone), and thus this quantity can be used to determine which regions on Earth can support tropical cyclones of a given intensity, and how these regions may evolve in time. Specifically, the maximum potential intensity has three components, but its variability in space and time is due predominantly to the variability in the surface-air enthalpy difference component $\Delta k$.

=== Derivation ===
A tropical cyclone may be viewed as a heat engine that converts input heat energy from the surface into mechanical energy that can be used to do mechanical work against surface friction. At equilibrium, the rate of net energy production in the system must equal the rate of energy loss due to frictional dissipation at the surface, i.e.

$$W_{in} = W_{out}$$

The rate of energy loss per unit surface area from surface friction, $W_{out}$, is given by

$$W_{out} = C_d \rho |\mathbf{u}|^3$$

where $\rho$ is the density of near-surface air ([kg/m^{3}]) and $|\mathbf{u}|$ is the near surface wind speed ([m/s]).

The rate of energy production per unit surface area, $W_{in}$ is given by

$$W_{in} = \epsilon Q_{in}$$

where $\epsilon$ is the heat engine efficiency and $Q_{in}$ is the total rate of heat input into the system per unit surface area. Given that a tropical cyclone may be idealized as a Carnot heat engine, the Carnot heat engine efficiency is given by

$$\epsilon = \frac{T_s-T_o}{T_s}$$

Heat (enthalpy) per unit mass is given by

$$k = C_pT + L_vq$$

where $C_p$ is the heat capacity of air, $T$ is air temperature, $L_v$ is the latent heat of vaporization, and $q$ is the concentration of water vapor. The first component corresponds to sensible heat and the second to latent heat.

There are two sources of heat input. The dominant source is the input of heat at the surface, primarily due to evaporation. The bulk aerodynamic formula for the rate of heat input per unit area at the surface, $Q_{in:k}$, is given by

$$Q_{in:k} = C_k \rho |\mathbf{u}|\Delta k$$

where $\Delta k = k^*_s-k$ represents the enthalpy difference between the ocean surface and the overlying air. The second source is the internal sensible heat generated from frictional dissipation (equal to $W_{out}$), which occurs near the surface within the tropical cyclone and is recycled to the system.

$$Q_{in:friction} = C_d \rho |\mathbf{u}|^3$$

Thus, the total rate of net energy production per unit surface area is given by

$$W_{in} = \frac{T_s-T_o}{T_s}\left(C_k \rho |\mathbf{u}|\Delta k + C_d \rho |\mathbf{u}|^3\right)$$

Setting $W_{in} = W_{out}$ and taking $|\mathbf{u}| \approx v$ (i.e. the rotational wind speed is dominant) leads to the solution for $v_p$ given above. This derivation assumes that total energy input and loss within the system can be approximated by their values at the radius of maximum wind. The inclusion of $Q_{in:friction}$ acts to multiply the total heat input rate by the factor $\frac{T_s}{T_o}$. Mathematically, this has the effect of replacing $T_s$ with $T_o$ in the denominator of the Carnot efficiency.

An alternative definition for the maximum potential intensity, which is mathematically equivalent to the above formulation, is

$$v_p = \sqrt{\frac{T_s}{T_o}\frac{C_k}{C_d}(CAPE^*_s-CAPE_b)|_m}$$

where CAPE stands for the Convective Available Potential Energy, $CAPE^*_s$ is the CAPE of an air parcel lifted from saturation at sea level in reference to the environmental sounding, $CAPE_b$ is the CAPE of the boundary layer air, and both quantities are calculated at the radius of maximum wind.

=== Characteristic values and variability on Earth ===
On Earth, a characteristic temperature for $T_s$ is 300 K and for $T_o$ is 200 K, corresponding to a Carnot efficiency of $\epsilon = 1/3$. The ratio of the surface exchange coefficients, $C_k/C_d$, is typically taken to be 1. However, observations suggest that the drag coefficient $C_d$ varies with wind speed and may decrease at high wind speeds within the boundary layer of a mature hurricane. Additionally, $C_k$ may vary at high wind speeds due to the effect of sea spray on evaporation within the boundary layer.

A characteristic value of the maximum potential intensity, $v_p$, is 80 metres per second (180 mph; 290 km/h). However, this quantity varies significantly across space and time, particularly within the seasonal cycle, spanning a range of 0 to 100 metres per second (0 to 224 mph; 0 to 360 km/h). This variability is primarily due to variability in the surface enthalpy disequilibrium ( $\Delta k$ ) as well as in the thermodynamic structure of the troposphere, which are controlled by the large-scale dynamics of the tropical climate. These processes are modulated by factors including the sea surface temperature (and underlying ocean dynamics), background near-surface wind speed, and the vertical structure of atmospheric radiative heating. The nature of this modulation is complex, particularly on climate time-scales (decades or longer). On shorter time-scales, variability in the maximum potential intensity is commonly linked to sea surface temperature perturbations from the tropical mean, as regions with relatively warm water have thermodynamic states much more capable of sustaining a tropical cyclone than regions with relatively cold water. However, this relationship is indirect via the large-scale dynamics of the tropics; the direct influence of the absolute sea surface temperature on $v_p$ is weak in comparison.

== Empirical limit ==
An empirical limit on tropical cyclone intensity can also be computed using the following formula:

$V = A + B \cdot e^{C(T-T_0)}$

Where $V$ is the maximum potential velocity in meters per second; $T$ is the sea surface temperature underneath the center of the tropical cyclone, $T_0$ is a reference temperature (30 ˚C) and $A$, $B$ and $C$ are curve-fit constants. When $A = 28.2$, $B = 55.8$, and $C = 0.1813$, the graph generated by this function corresponds to the 99th percentile of empirical tropical cyclone intensity data.

== See also ==
- Atmospheric thermodynamics
- Lifted index
