= Cyclone Qendresa =

Mediterranean cyclone in 2014

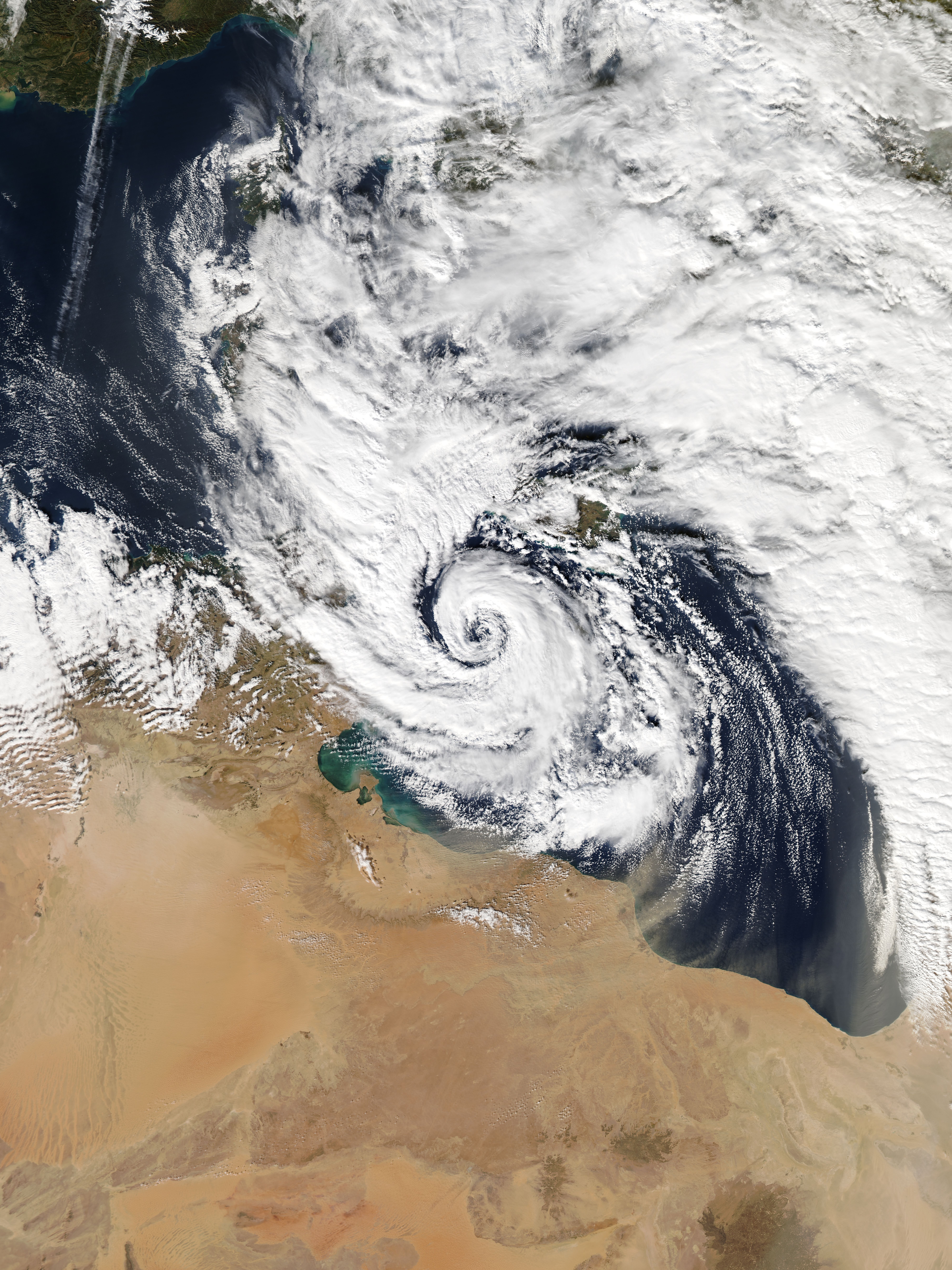
- Qendresa nearing peak intensity on 7 November, while approaching Malta

Meteorological history
- Formed: 5 November 2014
- Dissipated: 11 November 2014

Category 1-equivalent tropical cyclone
- 1-minute sustained (SSHWS)
- Highest winds: 120 km/h (75 mph)
- Highest gusts: 175 km/h (110 mph)
- Lowest pressure: 978 hPa (mbar); 28.88 inHg

Overall effects
- Fatalities: 3 killed
- Damage: $250 million (2014 USD) €212.82 million (2014 Euro)
- Areas affected: Libya, Tunisia, Italy, Malta, Greece

Cyclone Qendresa, also known as Medicane Qendresa, was one of the most intense Mediterranean tropical-like cyclones on record, which struck Malta and the Italian island of Sicily in 2014. The storm formed on 5 November and rapidly intensified two days later, reaching peak intensity on 7 November, due to a cold-core low aloft. Qendresa directly hit Malta in the afternoon and then crossed the eastern coast of Sicily on 8 November. Later, the cyclone weakened significantly and dissipated over Crete on 11 November. Academic sources indicate that Qendresa transitioned into a subtropical cyclone, prior to reaching peak intensity. Qendresa caused three fatalities, and at least $250 million (2014 USD) in damages in Italy.

== Meteorological history ==
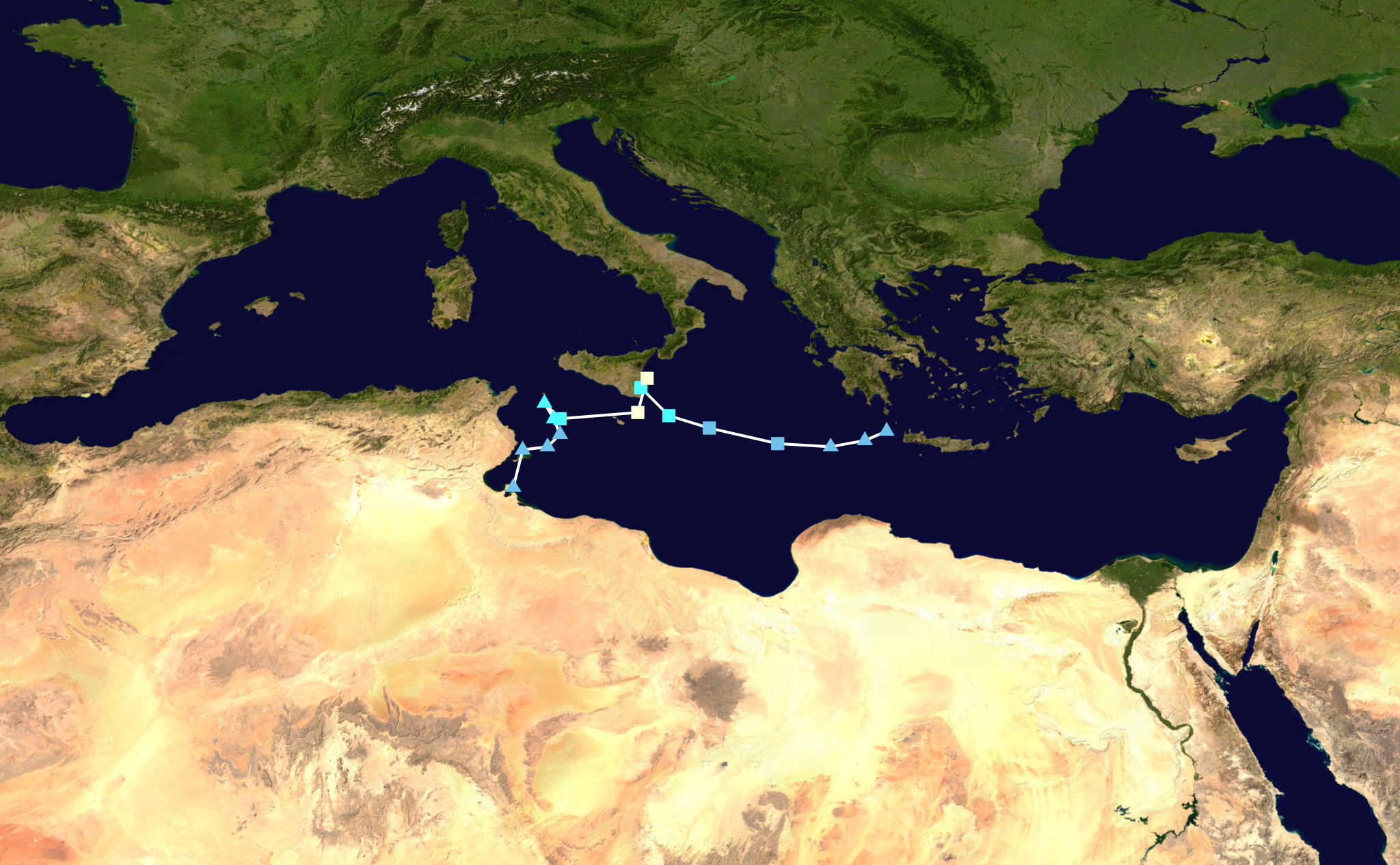
Map plotting the storm's track and intensity, according to the Saffir–Simpson scale Map key Saffir–Simpson scale Tropical depression (≤38 mph, ≤62 km/h) Tropical storm (39–73 mph, 63–118 km/h) Category 1 (74–95 mph, 119–153 km/h) Category 2 (96–110 mph, 154–177 km/h) Category 3 (111–129 mph, 178–208 km/h) Category 4 (130–156 mph, 209–251 km/h) Category 5 (≥157 mph, ≥252 km/h) Unknown Storm type Tropical cyclone Subtropical cyclone Extratropical cyclone, remnant low, tropical disturbance, or monsoon depression

A shortwave trough near the British Isles started to expand southwards to North Africa on 3 November, which caused Lake Maggiore in Italy to overflow. Although the Institute of Meteorology of the Free University of Berlin had assigned the name Qendresa to an expected low-pressure area developed within the trough on 4 November, it actually gave the name to two different systems on 5 November, resulting in Qendresa I to the south and Qendresa II to the north. On 6 November, the southern tip of Qendresa I started to develop a low-level circulation centre (LLCC) near Kerkennah Islands, and it is referred to simply as Qendresa later by most of the documents and reports. The trough also developed two upper-level circulation centres (ULCCs) on the same day— the one near the southeastern coast of France quickly dissipated, yet the one in Algeria moved to Tunisia and then entered the Strait of Sicily the next day, becoming a cut-off low from the trough.

When Qendresa's LLCC was moving north-northeastwards and combining with the ULCC early on 7 November, the system occluded quickly and intensified dramatically. Thanks to sea surface temperature over 23 °C (73 °F) and the strong cold air at middle and upper levels, Qendresa formed an eye-like feature surrounded by deep convection near Linosa around noon. Shortly before 17:00 CET (16:00 UTC), Qendresa directly hit Malta, around which time Qendresa lost its fronts and acquired a more well-defined eye. MOLOCH, an Italian model, estimated that the low-level temperature of Qendresa's eye was about 6 °C (11 °F) warmer than the surrounding area with the no longer cold middle and upper levels at that time, suggesting a warm-core system. Around this time, Qendresa was believed to have transitioned into a subtropical cyclone. At the peak intensity, Qendresa had a minimum low pressure of 978 hPa (28.88 inHg), maximum sustained winds of at least 110.9 km/h (68.9 mph; 59.9 kn), and maximum gusts of at least 153.7 km/h (95.5 mph; 83.0 kn). Interacting with Sicily, the cyclone turned northeastwards and started to make an anticlockwise loop to the east of the Italian island. On 8 November, Qendresa tracked along the coast of Catania and crossed Syracuse in the morning. It was significantly eroded because of the terrain of Sicily and increasing vertical wind shear, resulting a partially exposed and weakening system later. On 9 November, Qendresa lost its cold front, and weakened into a non-tropical low, near the island of Crete. On 10 November, the system continued to decay, while moving over the island of Crete. On 11 November, Qendresa dissipated over Crete.

== Impact ==
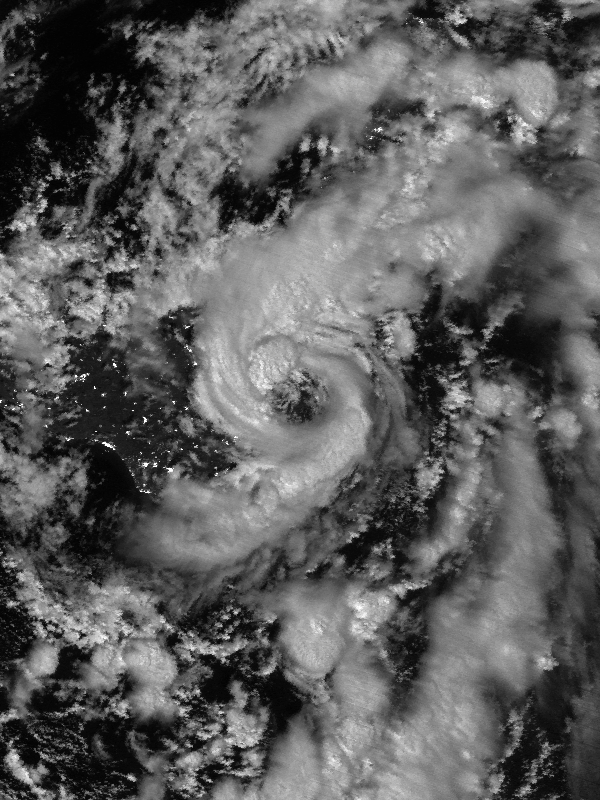
Qendresa near Sicily on 8 November, shortly after peak intensity

Malta experienced a direct hit similar to a typical tropical cyclone from Qendresa. In St. Paul's Bay, a coastal town in northern Malta, the weather station of Buġibba recorded ten-minute sustained winds at 110.9 km/h (68.9 mph) and the gust at 153.7 kilometres per hour (95.5 mph; 83.0 kn) at 16:58 CET (15:58 UTC), the strongest recorded overland from a Mediterranean tropical-like cyclone in history; about 15 minutes later, the central pressure at 978.6 hPa (28.90 inHg) was recorded inside the eye with totally calm conditions, the lowest of all Mediterranean tropical-like cyclones since reliable records. Weather stations across other areas also recorded significant gusts from Qendresa. At Malta International Airport, it recorded the gust at 119 km/h (74 mph). Lampedusa, the largest of Italy's Pelagian Islands, recorded the gust at 135 km/h (84 mph). Qendresa drowned 3 people in Italy, and caused at least 250 million GBP (2014 EURO) in damages.

Qendresa caused chaos in Malta. Airport operations were suspended, and harbours were also closed. With many cars stalled in flooded streets throughout low-lying areas, the cyclone caused a traffic nightmare across the island. Power outages happened in several towns as electricity poles were brought down by strong winds; besides, many trees were uprooted. Qendresa brought similar damages to the eastern part of Sicily, including eroded coasts, blown off roofs, and overturned boats.

== See also ==
- Tropical Storm Rolf
- Cyclone Numa
- Cyclone Ianos
- 1996 Lake Huron cyclone
