= Cyclone Numa =

Mediterranean tropical-like cyclone in 2017

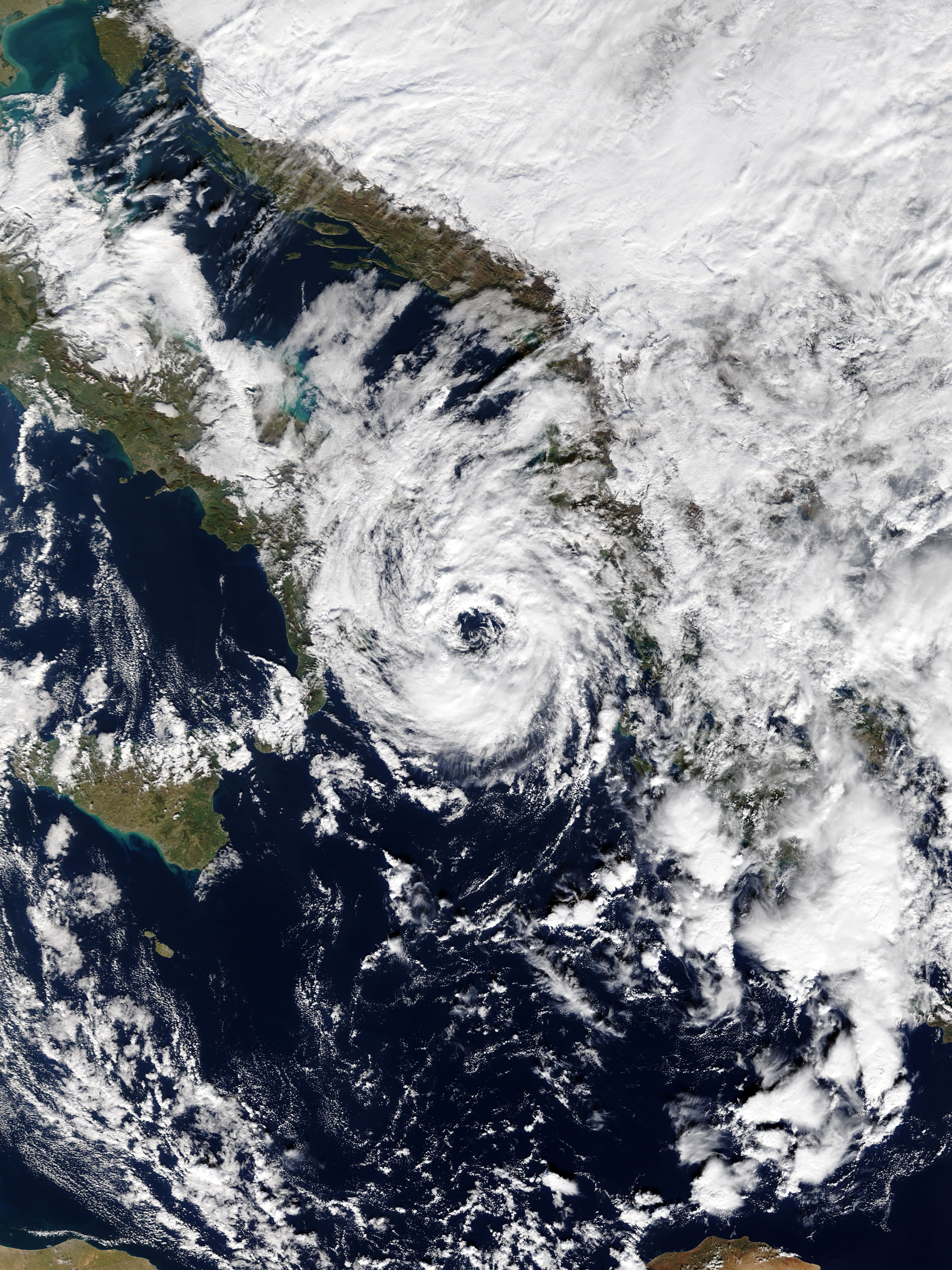
- Numa over the Ionian Sea on 18 November, after peak intensity

Meteorological history
- Formed: 11 November 2017
- Dissipated: 20 November 2017

Tropical storm
- Highest winds: 100 km/h (65 mph)
- Lowest pressure: 995 hPa (mbar); 29.38 inHg

Overall effects
- Fatalities: 22
- Damage: $100 million (2017 USD) €85 million (2017 Euro)
- Areas affected: United Kingdom, Ireland, France, Italy, Tunisia, Greece, Turkey

Cyclone Numa, also known as Medicane Numa, was a Mediterranean tropical-like cyclone with the properties of a subtropical cyclone. Numa formed on 11 November 2017 west of the British Isles, out of the extratropical remnants of Tropical Storm Rina, the seventeenth named storm of the 2017 Atlantic hurricane season. Subsequently, on 17 November, Numa acquired subtropical characteristics before reaching peak intensity on 18 November, becoming a rare "medicane". After making landfall in Greece on 18 November, Numa rapidly weakened, and was later absorbed into another extratropical storm on 20 November. The flooding triggered by Numa became the worst weather event Greece had experienced since 1977, and the storm caused an estimated $100 million (2017 USD) in damages in Europe.

The National Observatory of Athens named the system Zenon.

== Meteorological history ==
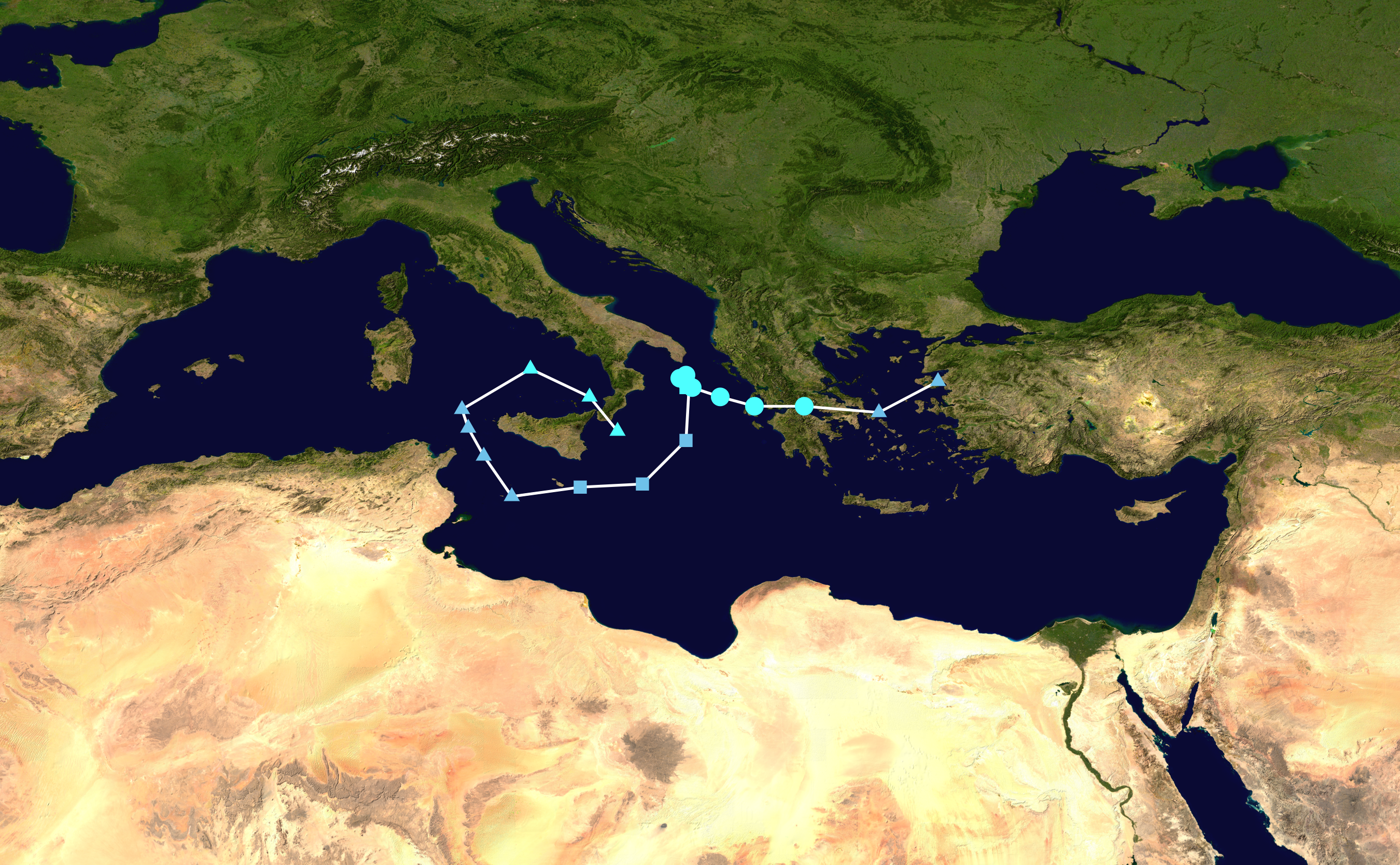
Map plotting the storm's track and intensity, according to the Saffir–Simpson scale Map key Saffir–Simpson scale Tropical depression (≤38 mph, ≤62 km/h) Tropical storm (39–73 mph, 63–118 km/h) Category 1 (74–95 mph, 119–153 km/h) Category 2 (96–110 mph, 154–177 km/h) Category 3 (111–129 mph, 178–208 km/h) Category 4 (130–156 mph, 209–251 km/h) Category 5 (≥157 mph, ≥252 km/h) Unknown Storm type Tropical cyclone Subtropical cyclone Extratropical cyclone, remnant low, tropical disturbance, or monsoon depression

On 12 November, the Free University of Berlin named a low-pressure system over the British Isles Numa. Moving southeastward, Numa quickly crossed the southern British Isles, and then France and Italy, before splitting into two low-pressure centres – Numa I and Numa II – on 13 November. Numa II was the stronger of the two, tracking down the centre of the Adriatic Sea, parallel to the Italian coastline and reaching an initial peak intensity of 995 hPa (29.4 inHg) on that day. By 14 November, low-pressure centre Numa I had dissipated, and Numa II dominated the system, and the system was referred to simply as "Numa," while it was located in the open Mediterranean, to the west of Greece.

Numa subsequently slowed and turned south, crossing southern Italy and emerging to the north of Sicily, before stalling over the island on 15 November. Clearing Sicily to the southeast on 16 November, Numa began to gain subtropical characteristics, while situated off the west coast of Greece, though by 16 November, the system was still extratropical. Around this time, some computer models forecasted that Numa may soon transition into a warm-core subtropical or tropical cyclone, which would bring stronger winds and more flash flooding to Greece if this were to occur.

On 17 November, Numa stalled in the Ionian Sea and completely lost its frontal system. On the afternoon of the same day, Météo France tweeted that Numa had attained the status of a subtropical Mediterranean depression. According to ESTOFEX, Numa showed numerous 83-kilometre-per-hour (52 mph; 45 kn) flags of 10-minute sustained winds in satellite data. During the next several hours, Numa continued to strengthen, before reaching its peak intensity on 18 November. Between 18:00 UTC on 17 November and 5:00 UTC on 18 November, Numa acquired evident tropical characteristics; between 22:00 UTC on 17 November and 01:00 UTC on 18 November, Numa began to display a hurricane-like structure; ESTOFEX still reported 10-minute sustained winds of 83 km/h (52 mph; 45 kn) at about this time. Around the time of Numa's peak, the storm had a clear, well-defined eye structure, with the National Oceanic and Atmospheric Administration noting an eyewall similar to that of a hurricane's. Satellite ASCAT indicated that the storm had 1-minute sustained winds of 102 km/h (63 mph; 55 kn), equivalent to tropical storm intensity, though the actual winds may have been higher, due to the small diameter of the storm. Later on the same day, Numa made landfall in Greece, producing a storm surge at the Gulf of Patras and damaging wind gusts, before rapidly weakening into a low-pressure area afterward. Subsequently, the system emerged into the Aegean Sea on 19 November. On 20 November, Numa was absorbed into another extratropical storm approaching from the north.

== Impact ==
Prior to Numa's arrival, unusually heavy rainfall from other storm systems had been affecting mainland Greece for around a week, leading to some localised flooding. The fire brigade had received over 600 calls relating to flooding in the days preceding Numa's arrival, dispatching more than 200 firefighters in 55 vehicles to villages across the country to assist.

Numa was linked to exceptionally heavy rainfall across the Balkans in mid-November, which lasted for over week, killing at least 21 people in Greece, with Athens being the worst affected area. However, the National Observatory of Athens did not link the flooding to Numa, naming an earlier low which had initiated the flooding Eurydice.

The flooding associated with Numa became the deadliest weather event that Greece has experienced since 1977.

Numa began to bring heavy rainfall to already saturated areas of the Balkans beginning on 15 November, causing severe flooding, especially in central mainland Greece. By 16 November, at least 16 people had been killed by flooding in the towns of Mandra, Megara, and Nea Peramos to the west of Athens, with five people missing. Many of those who were killed were elderly residents unable to escape their homes, as floodwaters quickly rose. On 19 November, the death toll in Greece increased to 19, while 3 people still remained missing. On 21 November, the death toll increased to 21, with 1 man still missing.

At least 86 people were rescued and at least 37 people were hospitalised across Greece, and more than one third of buildings were destroyed in the town of Nea Peramos, including over 1,000 homes. Thousands of homes were left without electricity or running water after being inundated by more than a metre of floodwater, with the national electricity grid suffering severe damage. More than 20 schools remained closed on 17 November, with further flooding anticipated, while Numa stalled off the Greek coast.

In the aftermath of the flooding, Greek Prime Minister Alexis Tsipras declared three days of national mourning and a state of emergency, saying it was "the least we can do". Food, water and blankets were distributed to victims in the worst affected towns. The deputy governor of the worst-affected West Attica region, Yiannis Vassileiou, likened the flooding to Niagara Falls, while mayor of Mandra Yianna Krikouki referred to the flooding as "biblical", with the flooding leaving "nothing standing" in the town. European Commission President Jean-Claude Juncker, French President Emmanuel Macron, and Turkish Deputy Prime Minister Hakan Çavuşoğlu expressed their condolences to the people of Greece, following the tragedy. A 364-cabin cruise ship was later opened up as a shelter for those made homeless by the disaster.

== See also ==
- Tropical cyclones in 2017
- Tropical Storm Rolf (2011)
- Cyclone Qendresa (2014)
- Cyclone Ianos (2020)
