= 1996 Lake Huron cyclone =

Unusual storm system in 1996

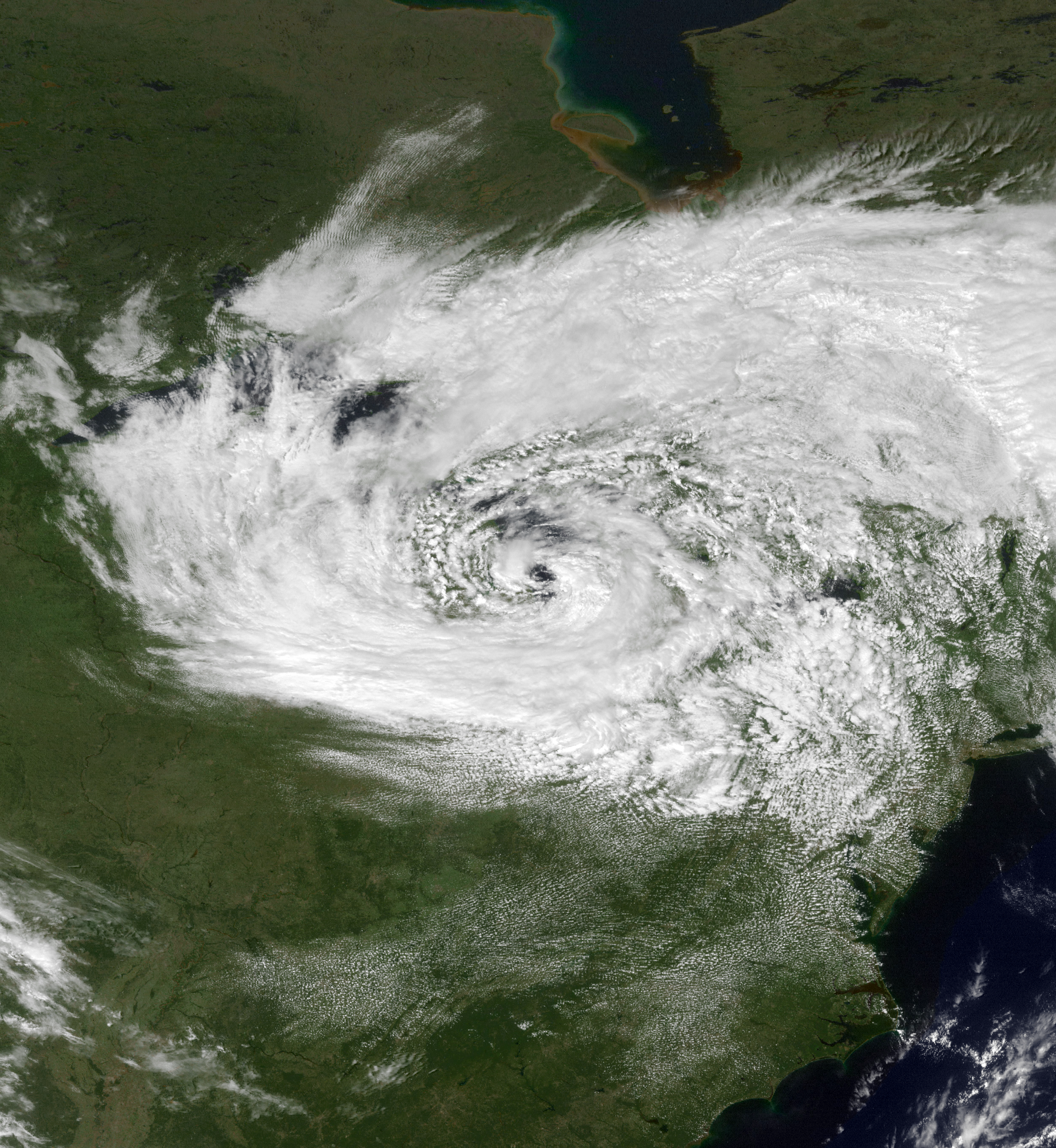
- The cyclone at peak intensity on September 14.

Meteorological history
- Formed: September 11, 1996
- Dissipated: September 15, 1996

Meteorological information
- 1-minute sustained
- Highest winds: 75 mph (120 km/h)
- Lowest pressure: 992 mbar (hPa); 29.29 inHg

Overall effects
- Fatalities: None
- Damage: Unknown
- Areas affected: Great Lakes region, Eastern Canada

The 1996 Lake Huron cyclone, commonly referred to as Hurricane Huron and Hurroncane, was an extremely rare, strong cyclonic storm system that developed over Lake Huron in September 1996. The system resembled a subtropical cyclone at its peak, bearing some characteristics of a tropical cyclone. It was the first time such a storm has ever been recorded forming over the Great Lakes region.

== Overview of tropical storms in the Great Lakes region ==
The Great Lakes region has experienced the remnants of several hurricanes, most commonly those which originally made U.S. landfall along the Gulf of Mexico. Very few such storms have retained any tropical characteristics by the time they reached the Great Lakes. In general, the strongest of these storms resulted from interactions between a hurricane remnant and an extratropical weather system. Only two such storms had hurricane-force winds over the Great Lakes.

After merging with a strong cold front, the remnant of the 1941 Texas hurricane had hurricane-force winds over Lake Huron and Lake Ontario, with steady winds of 56 miles per hour (90 km/h) reported over Detroit. Half of the resulting deaths occurred in Toronto, and many injuries resulted from windows blown out in Detroit. Although the center of the storm was tracked over Chicago and other highly populated areas, no other inland region reported similar damage. Similar to the 1996 Lake Huron cyclone, the 1941 hurricane tracked over the Great Lakes in September, when the lakes are at their warmest.

Hurricane Hazel entered the Great Lakes region as an extratropical storm just west of Toronto. The storm had lost most of its intensity after tracking over 600 miles (970 km) inland. However, the remnant interacted with a trough just south of Lake Erie, resulting in explosive strengthening as it entered the Great Lakes region. Hurricane Hazel was an October storm with winds equivalent to a Category 1 hurricane by the time it reached Canada, but most of its damage was caused by extreme rainfall on already-saturated ground.

Despite not having hurricane-force winds, the Great Charleston hurricane of 1893, the Georgia hurricane of 1898, Hurricane Connie of 1955 and Hurricane Fran of 1996 are also notable as they are one of very few storms to make a tropical landfall in the Great Lakes as well.

In contrast, the 1996 Lake Huron cyclone developed tropical characteristics over the Great Lakes region completely independent of precursor tropical cyclones. This makes it unique among Great Lakes storms.

== Meteorological history ==
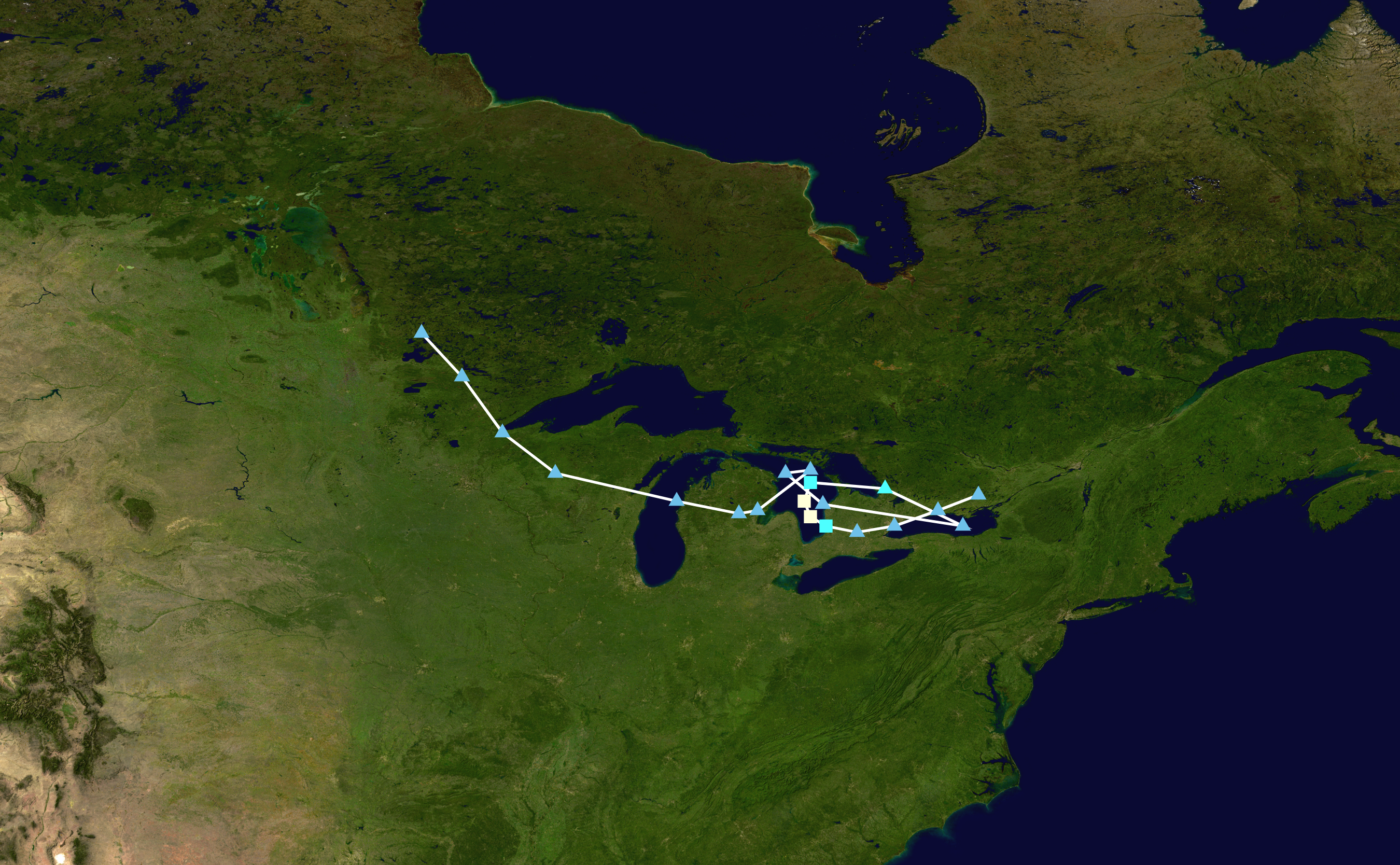
Map plotting the storm's track and intensity, according to the Saffir–Simpson scale Map key Saffir–Simpson scale Tropical depression (≤38 mph, ≤62 km/h) Tropical storm (39–73 mph, 63–118 km/h) Category 1 (74–95 mph, 119–153 km/h) Category 2 (96–110 mph, 154–177 km/h) Category 3 (111–129 mph, 178–208 km/h) Category 4 (130–156 mph, 209–251 km/h) Category 5 (≥157 mph, ≥252 km/h) Unknown Storm type Tropical cyclone Subtropical cyclone Extratropical cyclone, remnant low, tropical disturbance, or monsoon depression

On September 11, 1996, a weak low-pressure area was situated close to Lake Superior, as well as a shortwave trough over Ontario. The storm was centered over Lake Michigan, and its central pressure was 1012 mbar (29.9 inHg). The northwest tilt of the low in the atmosphere indicated that the surface center was strengthening, due to baroclinic forcing. In addition to this, analyses of the atmosphere concluded that the cyclone's circulation extended into the upper troposphere.

The cyclone's overall strength increased dramatically while meandering over the Great Lakes, with surface sustained winds building from 11 to 67 mph (18 to 108 km/h). (Note: All winds are one-minute sustained unless otherwise noted.) By September 12, the cyclone had been steered by a cold front to a position over Lake Huron, with the cyclone's upper-level circulation centered to the west, over Michigan. During this 24-hour period, the cyclone's central pressure fell from 1012 to 1006 mbar (29.9 to 29.7 inHg). After 12:00 UTC on September 12, the low moved southeastward and became more vertically organized.

The cyclone briefly passed over Lake Huron as it proceeded southeastward. The cyclone's lower levels experienced the highest intensification. As the cyclone's component layers were well-stacked, the storm was ripe for development. Eventually, the cold front to the north, which was connected to the surface low, became an occluded front, as it entangled with the surface warm front. The occluded front extended from Lake Huron to Pennsylvania on September 13. A 155-mile (250 km) swath of showers and thunderstorms was positioned across the area. More showers were centered near the occluded low.

Between 12:00 UTC on September 13 and 00:00 UTC on September 14, a shortwave trough rotated throughout the area of the occluded front. This caused the mid-level portion of the cyclone to move eastward, centering itself just east of Lake Huron. During the same period, the surface circulation of the storm moved slowly over Lake Huron, beginning to align with the mid-level circulation, and deepened to 999 mbar (29.5 inHg). In response to this intensification, the maximum sustained winds of the storm increased as well. After 00:00 UTC on September 14, the lower-level and mid-level circulations of the cyclone moved westward, becoming vertically stacked again. In contrast to the earlier developments, the baroclinic processes of the system weakened rapidly, and the system became more shallow. However, the low-level circulation of the cyclone continued to intensify, and the storm's central pressure dropped to 992 mbar (29.3 inHg), as the storm reached its peak intensity, due to increased circulation. At the time of its peak intensity, the cyclone had maximum sustained winds of 73 miles per hour (117 km/h), equivalent to that of a high-end tropical storm, and on the threshold of a Category 1 hurricane on the Saffir–Simpson scale (SSHWS).

Between 12:00 UTC on September 14 and 00:00 UTC on September 15, visible satellite imagery of the cyclone revealed that it resembled subtropical cyclone, as it possessed multiple characteristics of a tropical cyclone while also possessing hybrid characteristics, with an eye-like feature about 19 miles (30 km) wide. In addition to the eye, convective clouds had also formed, creating an eyewall resembling that seen in tropical cyclones. Furthermore, bands of convection continued extending westward about 310 miles (500 km). Soon afterward, prevailing winds in the area shifted to the east-northeast and rapidly increased, shearing the system, causing it to weaken. In contrast to the earlier stages of the system's life, the system was now much shallower and harbored energy closer to the surface. Surface analysis indicated that the cyclone had multiple central circulations at the time, with a weaker cyclonic circulation persisting over the eastern shore of Lake Huron and another center north of Lake Ontario. During this 12-hour period, the cyclone decayed rapidly, mainly in the lower troposphere. Twelve-hour height rises also occurred in the structure of the cyclone, with the air pressure increasing at various layers of the cyclone, ranging from 197 feet (60 m) at the surface level to 66 feet (20 m) at the 300 mbar (8.9 inHg)-level. On September 15, the cyclone weakened into a remnant low and left Lake Huron, before dissipating soon afterward. High waves were also created by the storm in Lake Erie.

== Impact ==
The cyclones generated waves approaching 3 metres (10 ft) in height on the Great Lakes. Excessive rain of over 4 inches (100 mm) fell over the land surrounding the Great Lakes, with Ontario, New York and Indiana seeing over 2 inches (50mm) of rain. This caused flooding in both the United States around Buffalo, New York and on the eastern shore of Lake Huron in Ontario, Canada. However, other than the flooding caused by the storm, there were no reports of fatalities or further significant damage from the storm.

== See also ==
- 1996 Atlantic hurricane season
- List of Canada hurricanes
- List of storms on the Great Lakes
