= Tropical cyclone basins =

Areas of tropical cyclone formation

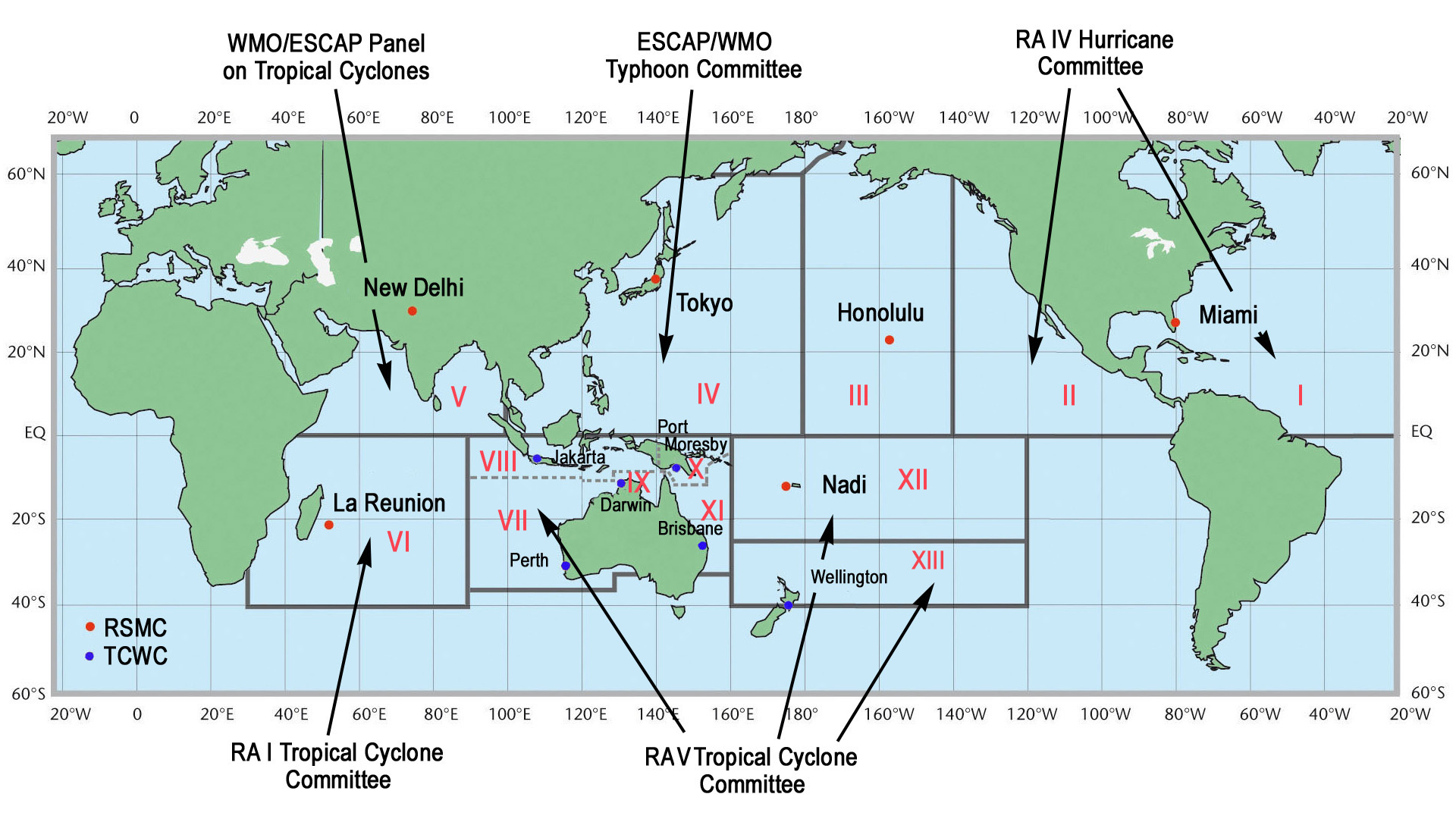
Official areas of responsibility, with their corresponding Regional Specialized Meteorological Centers and Tropical Cyclone Warning Centers.

Traditionally, areas of tropical cyclone formation are divided into seven basins. These include the North Atlantic Ocean, the eastern and western parts of the North Pacific Ocean, the Southwest Pacific, the Southwest and Southeast Indian Oceans, and the North Indian Ocean (Arabian Sea and Bay of Bengal). The West Pacific is the most active and the north Indian the least active. An average of 86 tropical cyclones of tropical storm intensity form annually worldwide, with 47 reaching hurricane/typhoon strength, and 20 becoming intense tropical cyclones, super typhoons, or major hurricanes (at least of Category 3 intensity).

== Overview ==
Tropical cyclone basins and official warning centres
Hemisphere	Basin	Warning Center	Area of responsibility	Refs
Northern	North Atlantic; Eastern Pacific	United States National Hurricane Center	Equator northward, African Coast – 180	
Northern	Western Pacific	Japan Meteorological Agency	Equator – 60°N, 180–100°E	
Northern	North Indian Ocean	India Meteorological Department	Equator northward, 100°E–45°E	
Southern	South-West Indian Ocean	Meteo France Reunion	Equator – 40°S, African Coast – 90°E	
Southern	Australian region	Badan Meteorologi, Klimatologi, dan Geofisika; Papua New Guinea National Weather Service; Australian Bureau of Meteorology	Equator – 10°S, 90–141°E; Equator – 10°S, 141–160°E; 10–36°S, 90–160°E	
Southern	Southern Pacific	Fiji Meteorological Service; Meteorological Service of New Zealand	Equator-25°S, 160°E – 120°W; 25–40°S, 160°E – 120°W	

== Northern Hemisphere ==
=== North Atlantic Ocean ===
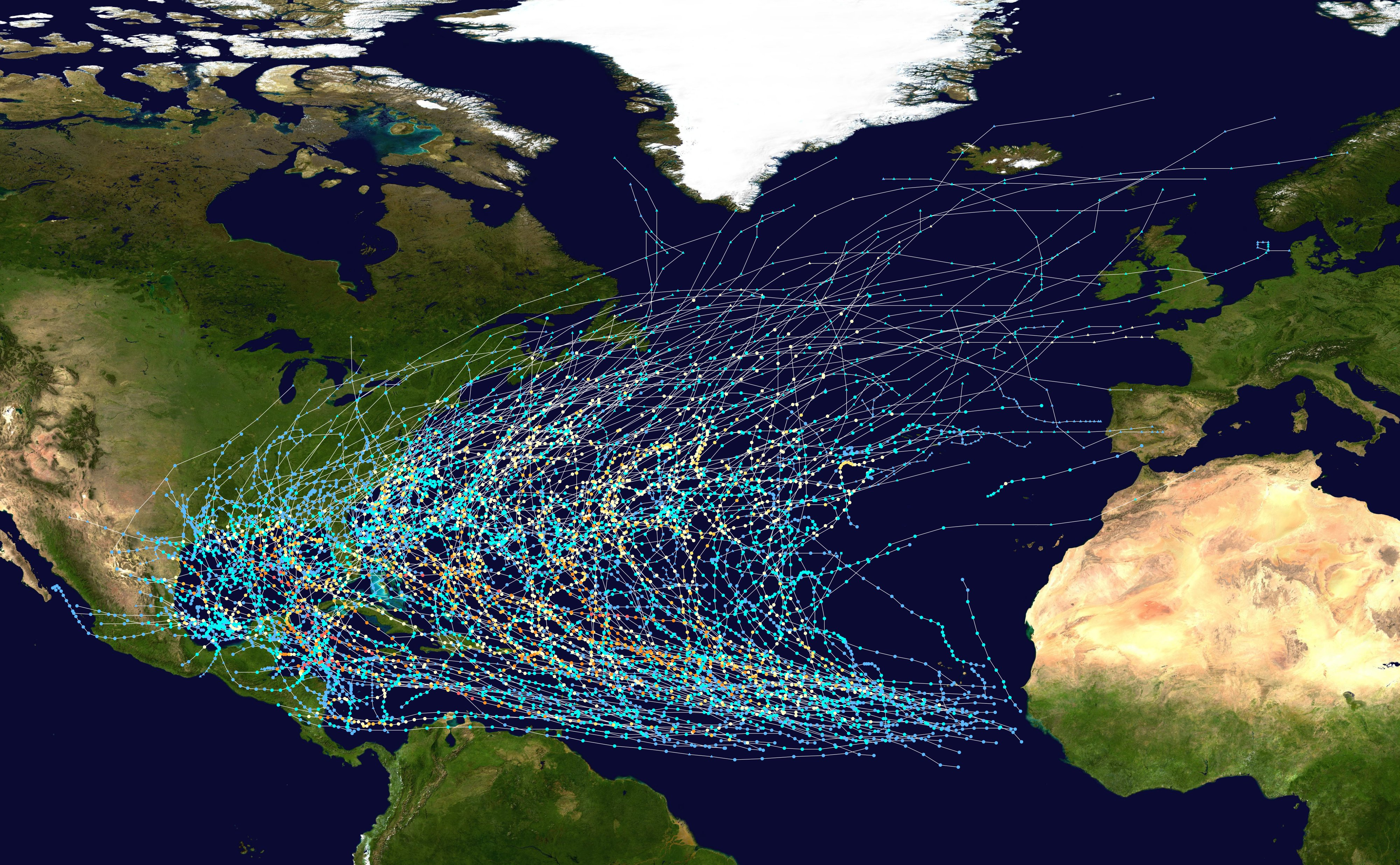
Tracks of all tropical cyclones in the northern Atlantic Ocean between 1980 and 2005

This region includes the North Atlantic Ocean, the Caribbean Sea, and the Gulf of Mexico. Tropical cyclone formation here varies widely from year to year, ranging from one to over twenty-five per year. Most Atlantic tropical storms and hurricanes form between June 1 and November 30. The United States National Hurricane Center (NHC) monitors the basin and issues reports, watches and warnings about tropical weather systems for the Atlantic Basin as one of the Regional Specialized Meteorological Centres for tropical cyclones as defined by the World Meteorological Organization. On average, 14 named storms (of tropical storm or higher strength) occur each season, with an average of 7 becoming hurricanes and 3 becoming major hurricanes. The climatological peak of activity is around September 10 each season.

The United States Atlantic coast and Gulf Coast, Mexico, Central America, the Caribbean Islands, and Bermuda are frequently affected by storms in this basin. Venezuela, the 4 provinces of Atlantic Canada, and Atlantic Macaronesian islands also are occasionally affected. Many of the more intense Atlantic storms are Cape Verde-type hurricanes, which form off the west coast of Africa near the Cape Verde islands. Occasionally, a hurricane that evolves into an extratropical cyclone can reach western Europe, including Hurricane Gordon, which spread high winds across Spain and the British Isles in September 2006. Hurricane Vince, which made landfall on the southwestern coast of Spain as a tropical depression in October 2005, and Subtropical Storm Alpha, which made landfall on the coast of Portugal as a subtropical storm in September 2020, are the only known systems to impact mainland Europe as a (sub)tropical cyclone in the NHC study period commencing in 1851 (it is believed a hurricane made landfall in Spain in 1842).

=== Northeastern Pacific Ocean ===
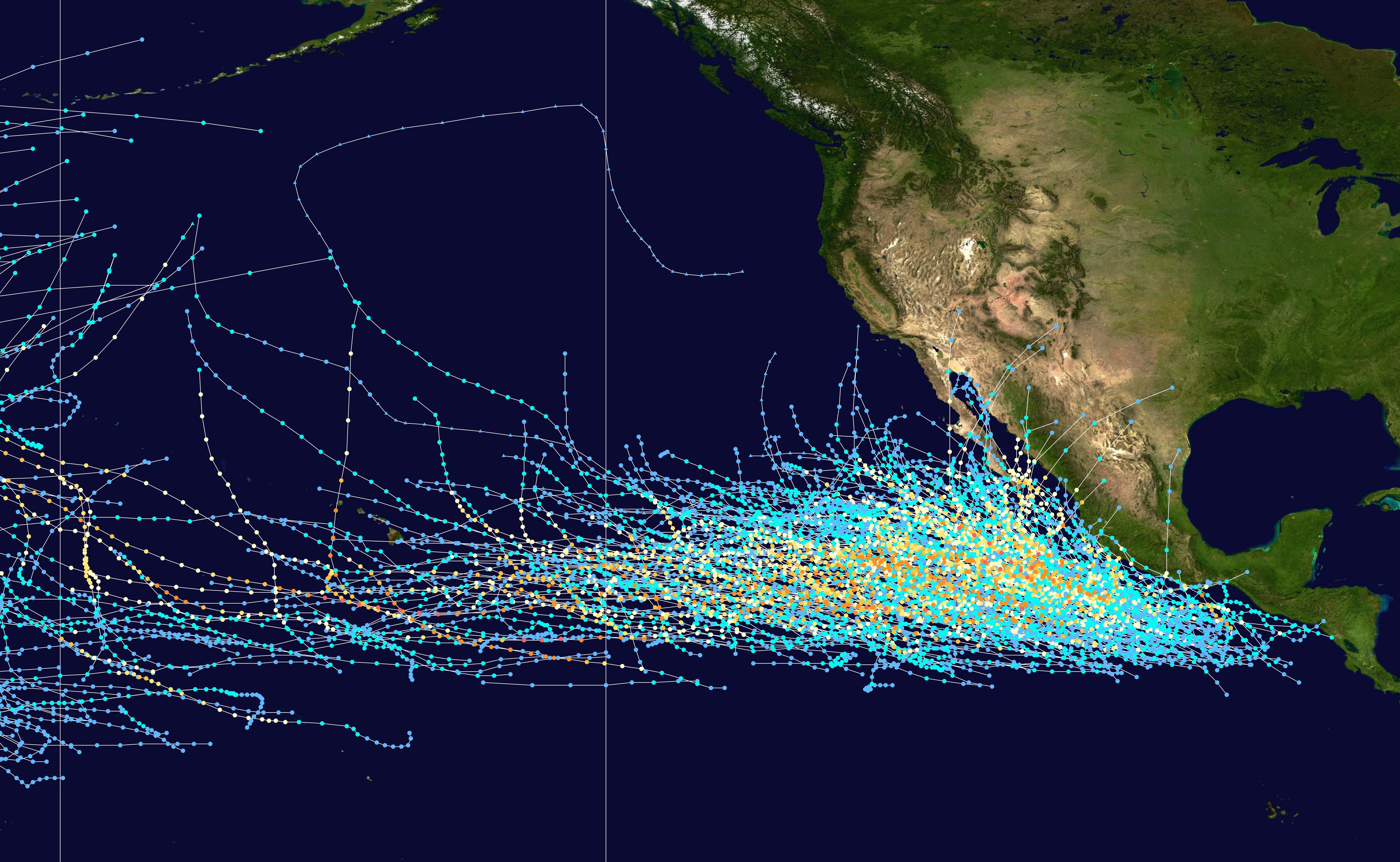
Tracks of all tropical cyclones in the northern Pacific Ocean east of the International Date Line between 1980 and 2005; the vertical line through the center separates the Central Pacific basin from the Northeastern Pacific basin.

The Northeastern Pacific is the second most active basin and has the highest number of storms per unit area. The hurricane season runs between May 15 and November 30 each year, and encompasses the vast majority of tropical cyclone activity in the region. In the 1971–2005 period, there were an average of 15–16 tropical storms, 9 hurricanes, and 4–5 major hurricanes (storms of Category 3 intensity or greater) annually in the basin.

Storms that form here often affect western Mexico, and less commonly the Continental United States (in particular California), or northern Central America. No hurricane included in the modern database has made landfall in California; however, historical records from 1858 speak of a storm that brought San Diego winds over 75 mph (65 kn; 121 km/h) (marginal hurricane force), though it is not known if the storm actually made landfall. Tropical storms in 1939, 1976, 1997 and 2023 brought gale-force winds to California.

The Central Pacific basin begins at the boundary with the Eastern Pacific basin at 140°W, and ends at the International Date Line, where the Northwestern Pacific begins. The hurricane season in the North Central Pacific runs annually from June 1 to November 30; The National Hurricane Center monitors storms that develop or move into the Central Pacific area of responsibility. Until August 2026, the Central Pacific Hurricane Center monitored the region, when it was merged into the NHC.

Central Pacific hurricanes are rare and on average 4 to 5 storms form or move in this area annually. As there are no large contiguous landmasses in the basin, direct hits and landfalls are rare; however, they occur occasionally, as with Hurricane Iniki in 1992, which made landfall on Hawaii, and Hurricane Ioke in 2006, which made a direct hit on Johnston Atoll.

=== Northwestern Pacific Ocean ===
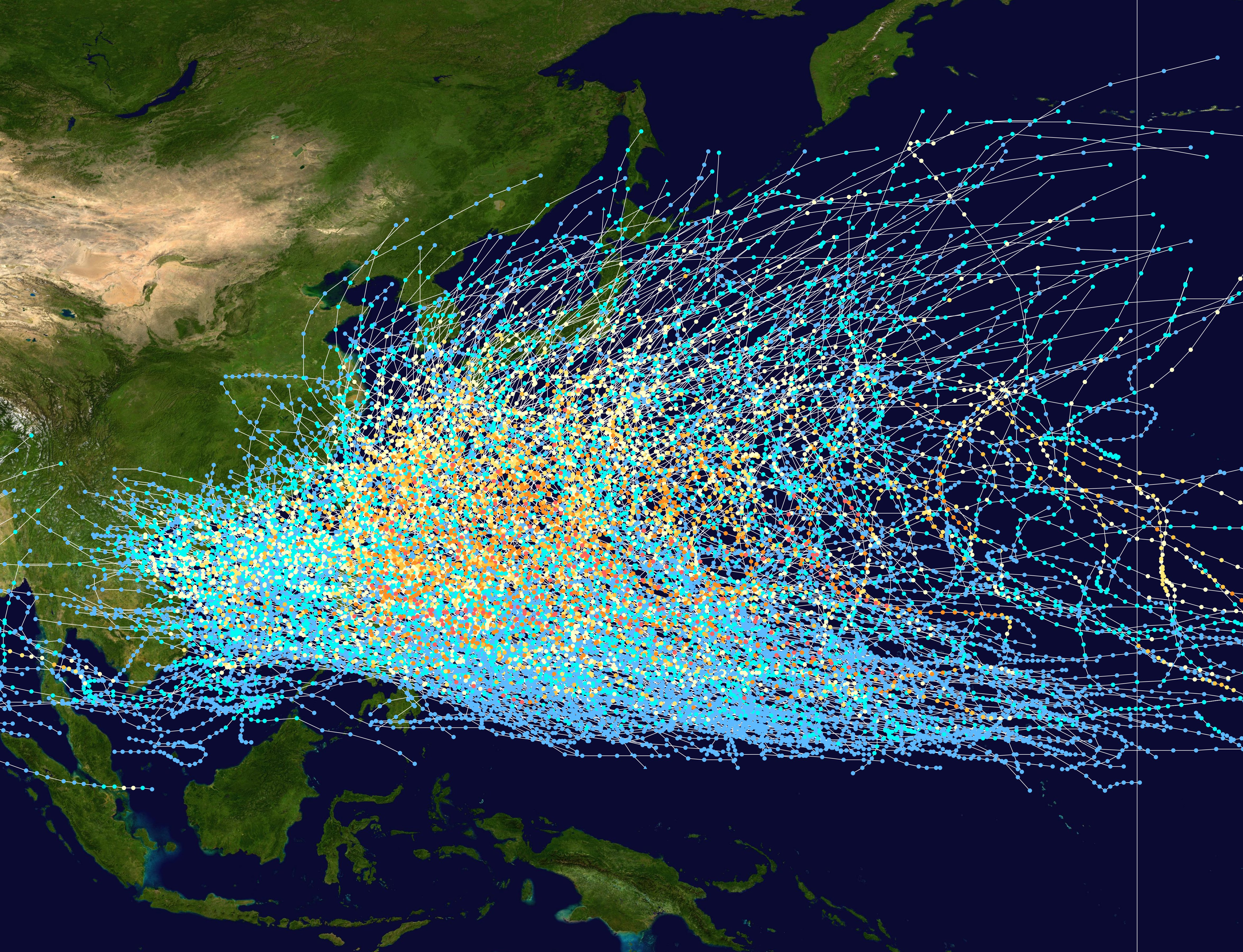
Tracks of all tropical cyclones in the northwestern Pacific Ocean between 1980 and 2005. The vertical line to the right is the International Date Line.

The Northwest Pacific Ocean, or Western North Pacific, is the most active basin on the planet, accounting for one third of all tropical cyclone activity. Annually, an average of 25.7 tropical cyclones in the basin acquire tropical storm strength or greater; also, an average of 16 typhoons occurred each year during the 1968–1989 period. The basin occupies all the territory north of the equator and west of the International Date Line, including the South China Sea. The basin sees activity year-round; however, tropical activity is at its minimum in February and March.

Tropical storms in this region often affect China, Hong Kong, Japan, the Koreas, Macau, Philippines, Taiwan and Vietnam, plus numerous Oceanian islands such as Guam, the Northern Marianas and Palau. Sometimes, tropical storms in this region are powerful and long lasting enough to affect the more inland South East Asian nations of Laos, Thailand, and Cambodia, and in extreme cases, even the equatorial nations of Singapore, Brunei, Malaysia, and Indonesia. The coast of China sees the most landfalling tropical cyclones worldwide. The Philippines receives an average of 6–7 tropical cyclone landfalls per year, with typhoons Haiyan and Goni in 2013 and 2020 being the strongest and most powerful landfalling storms to date.

=== North Indian Ocean ===
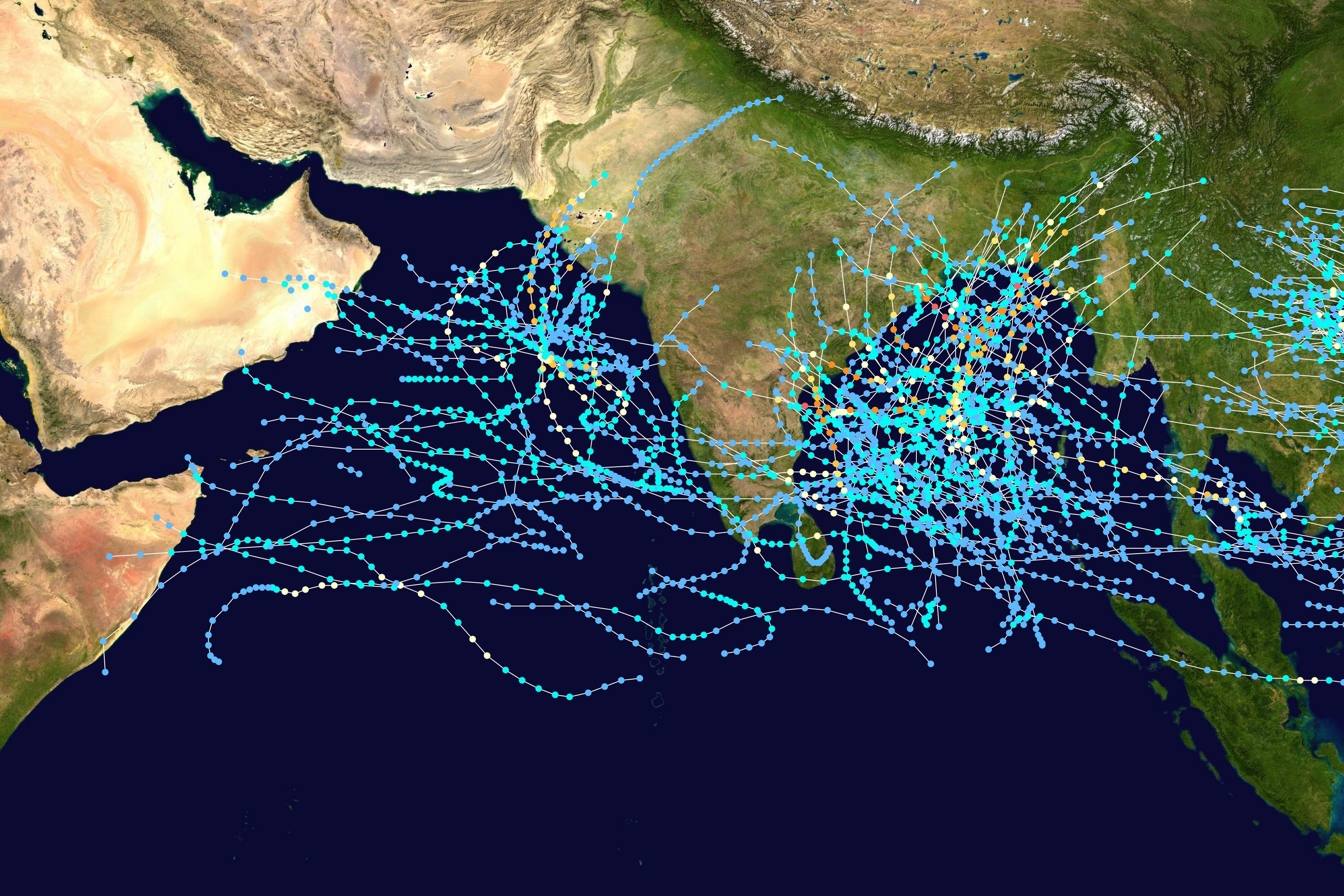
Tracks of all tropical cyclones in the northern Indian Ocean between 1980 and 2005

This basin is divided into two areas: the Bay of Bengal and the Arabian Sea, with the Bay of Bengal dominating (5 to 6 times more activity). Still, this basin is the least active worldwide, with only 4 to 6 storms per year.

This basin’s season has a double peak: one in April and May, before the onset of the monsoon, and another in October and November, just after. This double peak occurs because powerful vertical wind shear in between the surface monsoonal low and upper tropospheric high during the monsoon season tears apart incipient cyclones. High shear explains why no cyclones can form in the Red Sea, which possesses the necessary depth, vorticity and surface temperatures year-round. Rarely do tropical cyclones that form elsewhere in this basin affect the Arabian Peninsula or Somalia; however, Cyclone Gonu caused heavy damage in Oman on the peninsula in 2007.

Although the North Indian Ocean is a relatively inactive basin, extremely high population densities in the Ganges and Ayeyarwady Deltas mean that the deadliest tropical cyclones in the world have formed here, including the 1970 Bhola cyclone, which killed 500,000 people. Nations affected include India, Bangladesh, Sri Lanka, Thailand, Myanmar, and Pakistan.

=== Mediterranean Sea ===
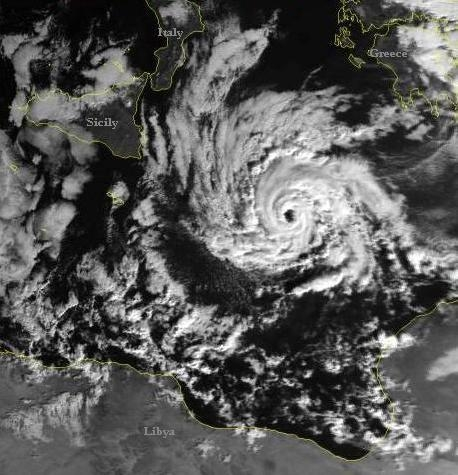
Image of the January 1995 system

On rare occasions, tropical-like systems that can reach the intensity of hurricanes, occur over the Mediterranean Sea. Such a phenomenon is called a Medicane (Mediterranean-hurricane). Although the geographical dimensions of tropical oceans and the Mediterranean Sea are clearly different, the precursor mechanisms of these perturbations, based on the air-sea thermodynamic imbalance, are similar. Their origins are typically non-tropical, and develop over open waters under strong, initially cold-core cyclones, similar to subtropical cyclones or anomalous tropical cyclones in the Atlantic Basin, like Karl (1980), Vince (2005), Grace (2009), Chris (2012), or Ophelia (2017). Sea surface temperatures in late-August and early-September are quite high over the basin (24/28 °C or 75/82 °F), though research indicates water temperatures of 20 °C (68 °F) are normally required for development.

Meteorological literature document that such systems occurred in September 1947, September 1969, January 1982, September 1983, January 1995, October 1996, September 2006, November 2011, November 2014, and November 2017. The 1995 system developed a well-defined eye, and a ship recorded 140 km/h (87 mph) winds, along with an atmospheric pressure of 975 hPa. Although it had the structure of a tropical cyclone, it occurred over 16 °C (61 °F) water temperatures, suggesting it could have been a polar low.

== Southern Hemisphere ==
Within the Southern Hemisphere tropical cyclones generally form on a regular basis between the African coast and the middle of the South Pacific. Tropical and Subtropical Cyclones have also been noted occurring in the Southern Atlantic Ocean at times. For various reasons including where tropical cyclones form, there are several different ways to split the area between the American and African coasts. For instance the World Meteorological Organization define three different basins for the tracking and warning of tropical cyclones. These are the South-West Indian Ocean between the African Coast and 90°E, the Australian region between 90°E and 160°E and the South Pacific between 160°E and 120°W. The United States Joint Typhoon Warning Center also monitors the whole region, but splits it at 135°E into the South Pacific and the Southern Indian Ocean.

=== South-West Indian Ocean ===
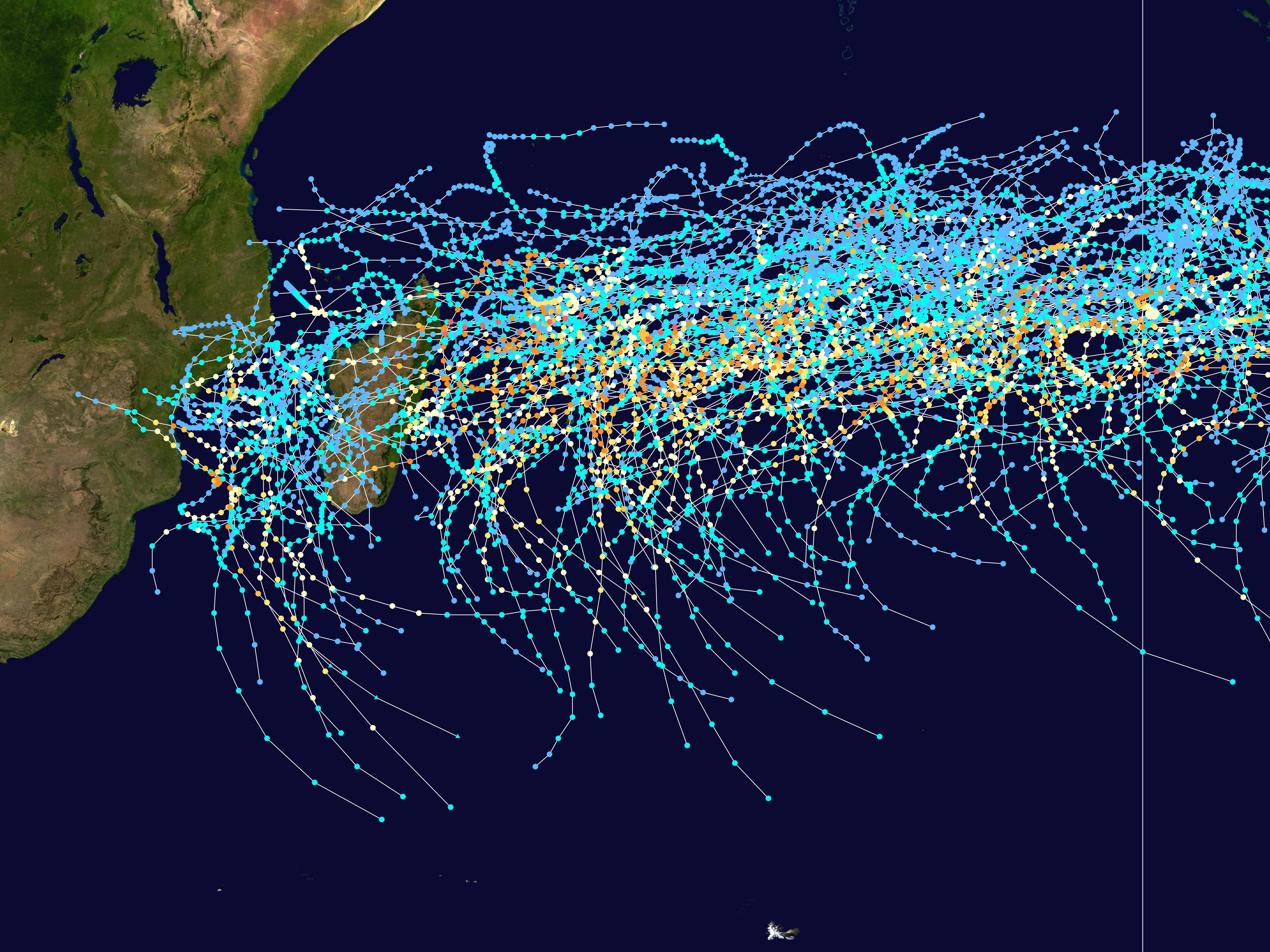
Tracks of all tropical cyclones in the southwestern Indian Ocean between 1980 and 2005

The South-West Indian Ocean is located within the Southern Hemisphere between Africa's east coast and 90°E and is primarily monitored by the Meteo France's La Reunion RSMC, while the Mauritian, Australian, Indonesian, and Malagasy weather services also monitor parts of it. Until the start of the 1985–86 tropical cyclone season the basin only extended to 80°E, with the 10 degrees between 80 and 90E considered to be a part of the Australian region. On average about 9 cyclones per year develop into tropical storms, while 5 of those go on to become tropical cyclones that are equivalent to a hurricane or a typhoon.

=== Australian region ===
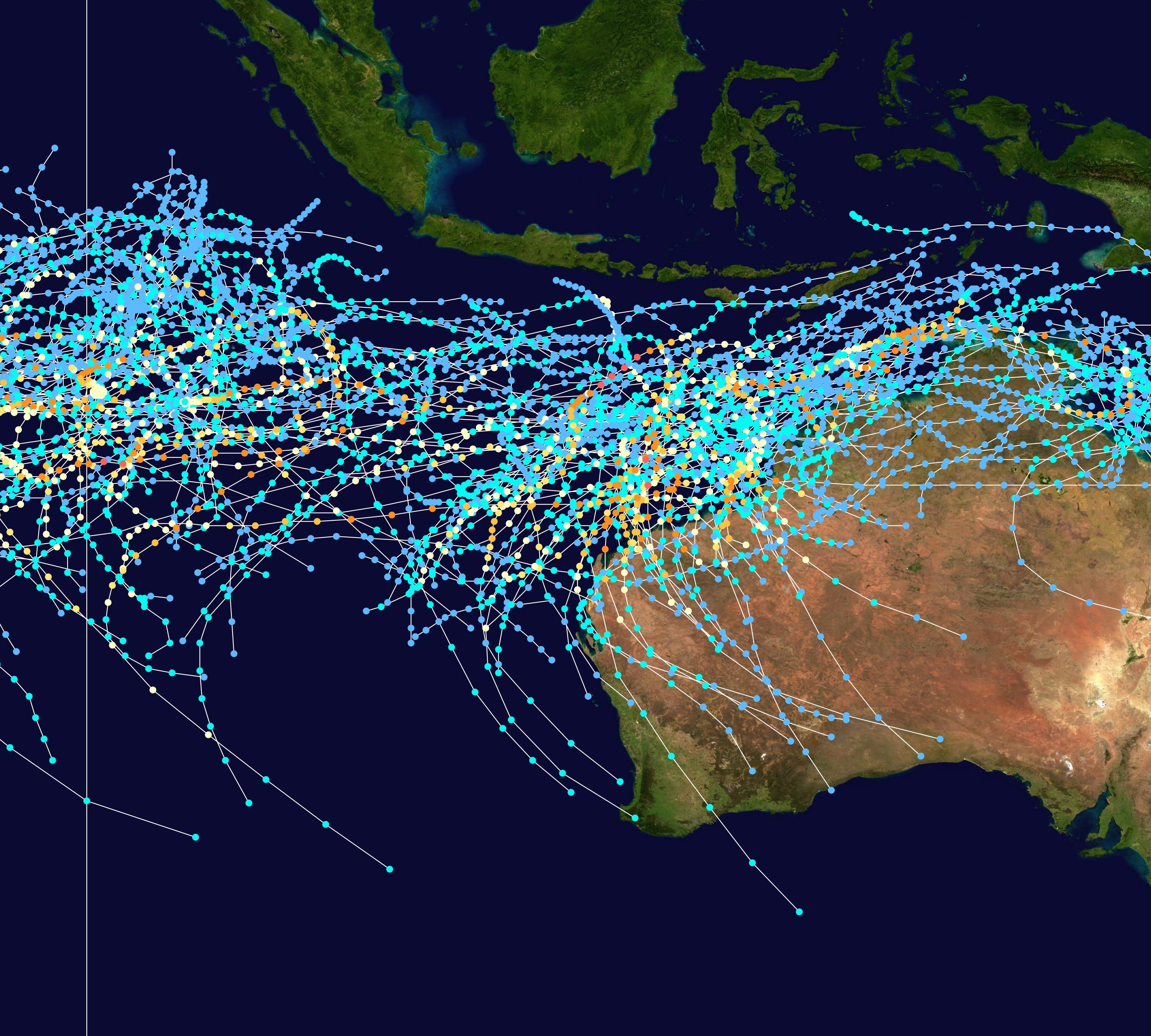
Tracks of all tropical cyclones in the southeastern Indian Ocean between 1980 and 2005

Through the middle of 1985, this basin extended westward to 80°E. Since then, its western boundary has been 90°E. Tropical activity in this region affects Australia and Indonesia. According to the Australian Bureau of Meteorology, the most frequently hit portion of Australia is between Exmouth and Broome in Western Australia. The basin sees an average of about seven cyclones each year, although more can form or come in from other basins, such as the South Pacific. The tropical cyclone Cyclone Vance in 1999 produced the highest recorded speed winds in an Australian town or city at around 267 km/h (166 mph).

=== South Pacific Ocean ===
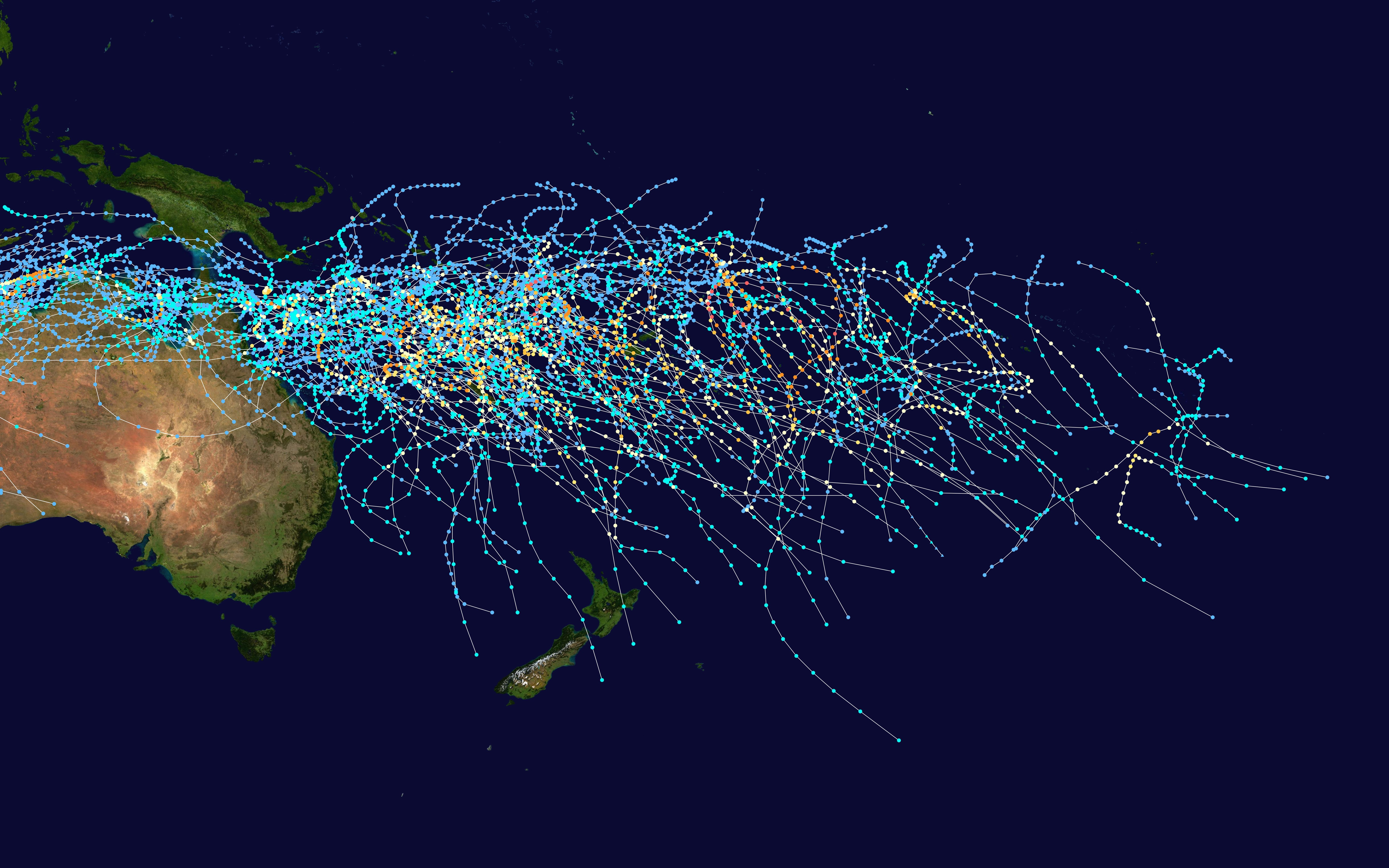
Tracks of all tropical cyclones in the southwestern Pacific Ocean between 1980 and 2005

The South Pacific Ocean basin runs between 160°E and 120°W, with tropical cyclones developing in it officially monitored by the Fiji Meteorological Service and New Zealand's MetService. Tropical Cyclones that develop within this basin generally affect countries to the west of the dateline, though during years of the warm phase of El Niño–Southern Oscillation cyclones have been known to develop to the east of the dateline near French Polynesia. On average the basin sees nine tropical cyclones annually with about half of them becoming severe tropical cyclones.

=== South Atlantic Ocean ===
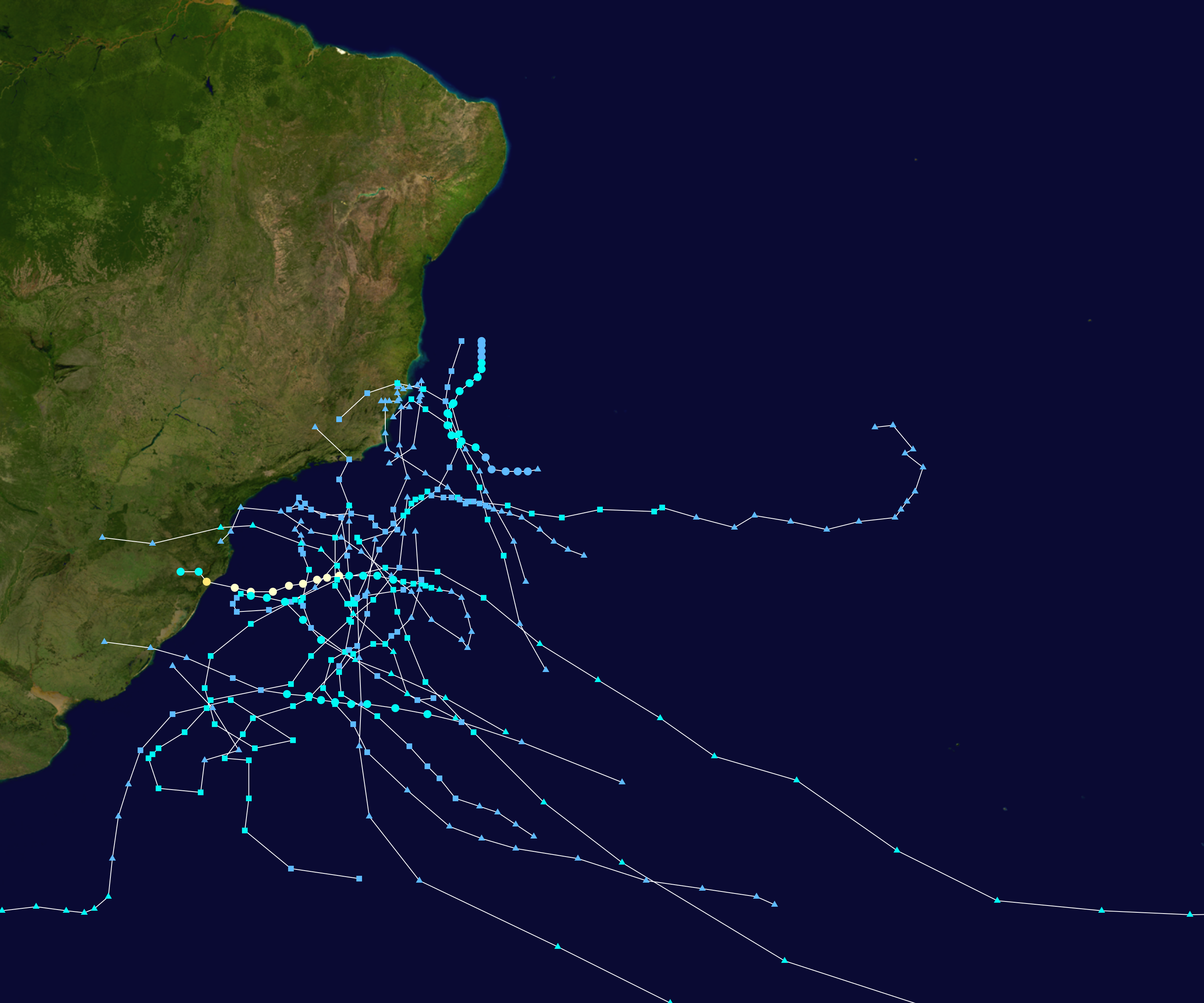
Tracks of named South Atlantic tropical and subtropical cyclones since 2004

Cyclones rarely form in other tropical ocean areas, which are not formally considered tropical cyclone basins. Tropical depressions and tropical storms occur occasionally in the south Atlantic, and the only full-blown tropical cyclones on record were the Angola tropical storm in 1991, Hurricane Catarina in 2004, Tropical Storm Anita in 2010, Tropical Storm Iba in 2019, Tropical Storm 01Q in 2021 and Tropical Storm Akará in 2024. The south Atlantic Ocean is not officially classified as a tropical cyclone basin by the World Meteorological Organization and does not have a designated regional specialized meteorological center (RSMC). However, beginning in 2011, the Brazilian Navy Hydrographic Center started to assign names to tropical and subtropical systems in this basin, when they have sustained wind speeds of at least 65 km/h (40 mph).

== See also ==
- Regional Specialized Meteorological Centre
- Outline of tropical cyclones
- List of Atlantic–Pacific crossover hurricanes
