= Hybrid low =

Hybrid low may refer to a number of different meteorological depressions:

- Kona storm, seasonal cyclone in the Hawaiian Islands
- Mediterranean tropical-like cyclone, rare meteorological phenomena observed in the Mediterranean Sea
- Nor'easter, a synoptic-scale cyclone
- Polar low, a small-scale, short-lived depression over certain ocean areas
- Subtropical cyclone, a weather system that has some characteristics of a tropical and an extratropical cyclone
- Superstorm, a large, destructive storm without another distinct meteorological classification

== Examples ==
- 1991 Perfect Storm, a nor'easter that absorbed Hurricane Grace
- 1996 Lake Huron cyclone, a strong cyclonic storm system over Lake Huron
- Hurricane Catarina, an extremely rare South Atlantic tropical cyclone
- 2006 Central Pacific cyclone, an unusual low pressure system that formed in 2006
- Tropical Storm Haiyan (2007), It developed from a tropical low that formed northeast of Wake Island
- Tropical Storm Omeka, Central Pacific storm that formed from a Kona storm
- Hurricane Sandy, destructive Atlantic hurricane that combined with a cold front to undergo extratropical transition just before landfall.
- Hurricane Alex (2016), Atlantic hurricane in January, a rarity
- Subtropical Storm 96C, A subtropical cyclone that formed from the remnants of Hurricane Lane (2018).

== See also ==
- Cyclogenesis
- Kármán vortex street
- South Atlantic tropical cyclone
- Tropical cyclone
- Tropical cyclogenesis
