= Subtropical cyclone =

Cyclonic storm with tropical and extratropical characteristics

Subtropical Storm Josephine at peak intensity off the Northeastern Seaboard on October 22, 2026.

A subtropical cyclone is a weather system that has some characteristics of both tropical and extratropical cyclones.

As early as the 1950s, meteorologists were uncertain whether they should be characterized as tropical or extratropical cyclones. They were officially recognized and titled by the National Hurricane Center in 1972. Beginning in 2002, subtropical cyclones began receiving names from the official tropical cyclone lists in the North Atlantic basin. Subtropical cyclones are also recognized in the South-West Indian Ocean and South Atlantic basins.

There are two definitions currently used for subtropical cyclones depending on their location. Across the north Atlantic and southwest Indian Ocean, they require some central convection fairly near the center surrounding a warming core existing in the mid-levels of the troposphere. Across the eastern half of the northern Pacific however, they require a mid-tropospheric cyclone to be cut off from the main belt of the westerlies and with only a weak surface circulation. Subtropical cyclones have wider wind fields with the maximum sustained winds located further from the center than typical tropical cyclones, and have no weather fronts linked into their center.

Since they form from initially extratropical cyclones which have colder temperatures aloft than normally found in the tropics, the sea surface temperatures required for their formation are lower than the tropical cyclone threshold (around 26.5°C (79.7°F)) by 3°C (5°F), lying around 23 °C (73 °F). This also means that subtropical cyclones are more likely to form outside the traditional bounds of the North Atlantic hurricane season and at higher latitudes. Subtropical cyclones are also observed to form in the South Atlantic, where subtropical cyclones are observed in all months.

== Etymology ==
Throughout the 1950s and 1960s, the terms semi-tropical and quasi-tropical were used for what would become known as the subtropical cyclones. The term subtropical cyclone initially merely referred to any cyclone located in the subtropical belt near and just north of the horse latitudes. Later, intense debate ensued in the late 1960s, after a number of hybrid cyclones formed in the Atlantic Basin. In 1972, the National Hurricane Center (NHC) finally designated these "hybrid" storms as true subtropical cyclones in real-time, and updated the hurricane database to include subtropical cyclones from 1968 through 1971.

The term "neutercane" began to be used for small subtropical cyclones below 100 miles in diameter which formed from mesoscale features, and the NHC began issuing public statements during the 1972 Atlantic hurricane season employing that classification. This name was not noted as controversial in contemporary news reports, but it was quickly dropped less than a year later. Recent articles, published after the year 2000, have suggested that the name "neutercane" was considered sexist in the 1970s, but there do not appear to be any published reports from that period making this claim.

== Naming ==
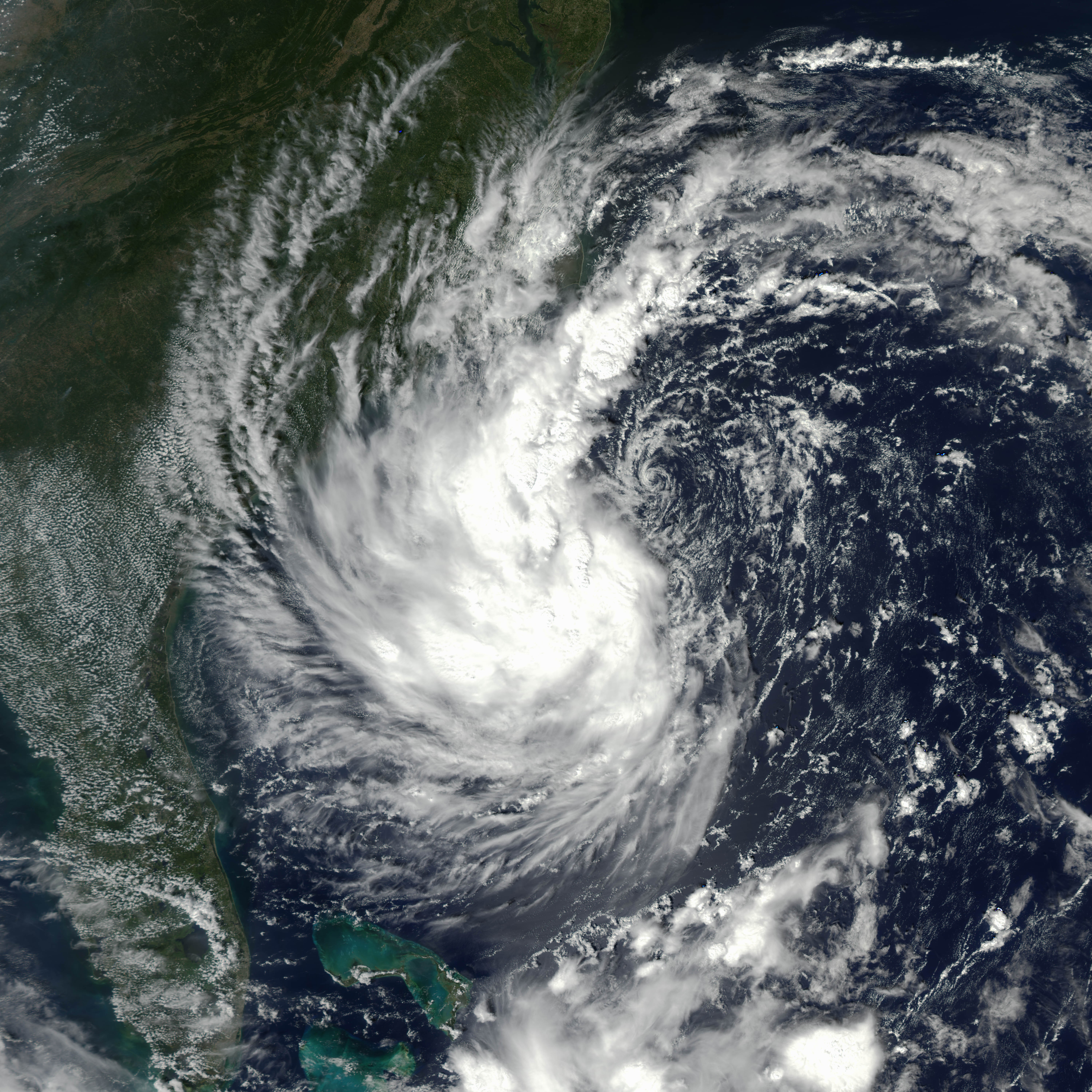
Subtropical Storm Gustav in 2002, the first system to be given a proper name as a subtropical cyclone

In the north Atlantic basin, subtropical cyclones were initially named from the NATO phonetic alphabet list in the early to mid-1970s. In the intervening years of 1975–2001, subtropical storms were either named from the traditional list and still was considered tropical in real-time, or used a separate numbering system instead. Between 1992 and 2001, two different numbers were given to subtropical depressions or subtropical storms, one for public use, the other one for NRL and NHC reference. For example, Hurricane Karen in 2001 was initially known as Subtropical Storm One as well as AL1301 (or 13L for short). In 2002, the NHC began giving numbers to subtropical depressions and names to subtropical storms from the same sequence as tropical cyclones. From 2002 onward, Subtropical Depression 13L would be known as Subtropical Depression Thirteen instead. Hurricane Gustav of 2002 was the first subtropical storm to receive a name but became tropical shortly after naming. Subtropical Storm Nicole from the 2004 Atlantic hurricane season was the first subtropical storm that did not become tropical since the policy change. A subtropical storm from the 2005 Atlantic hurricane season also did not become tropical, but was not named since it was not recognized until post-season analysis.

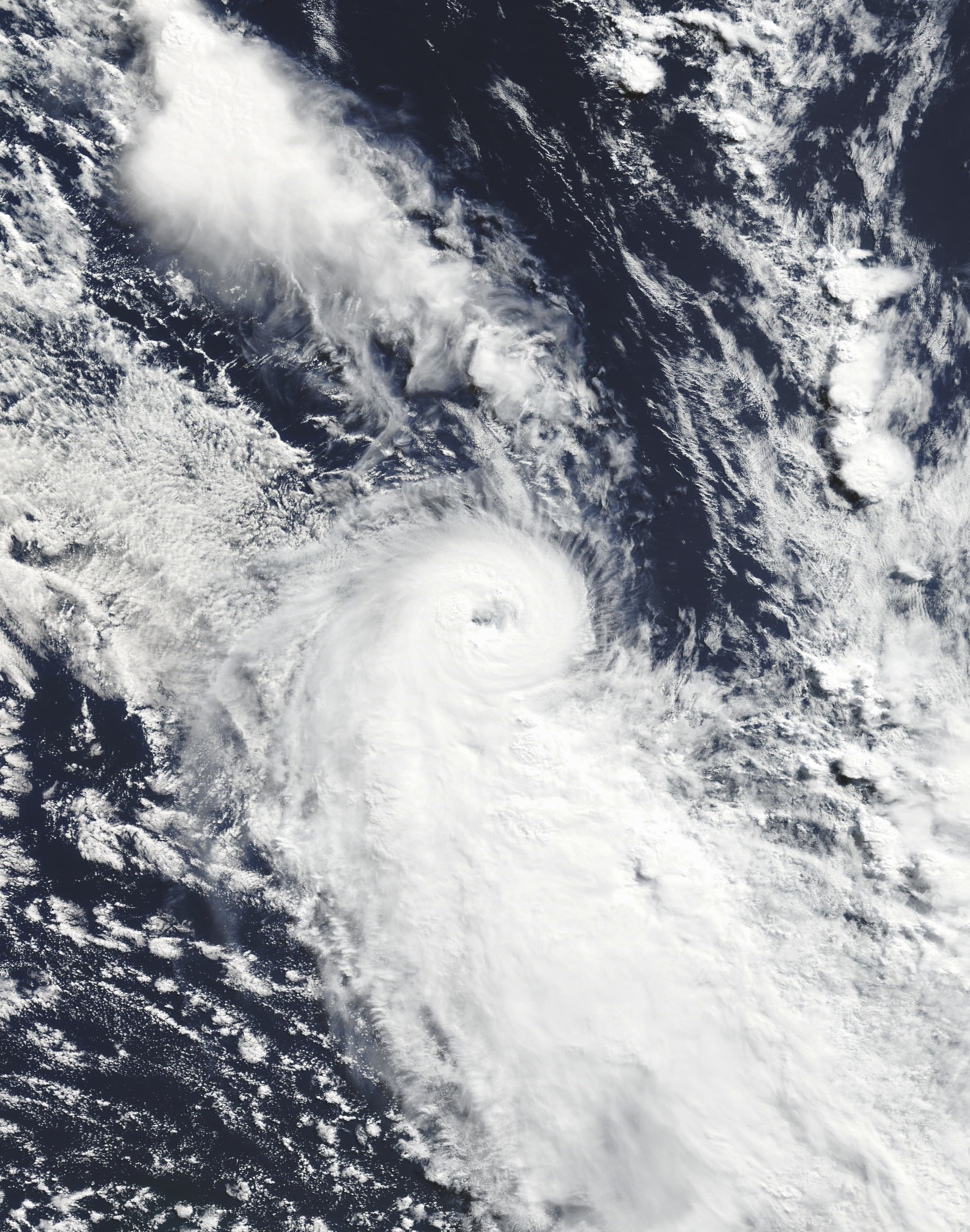
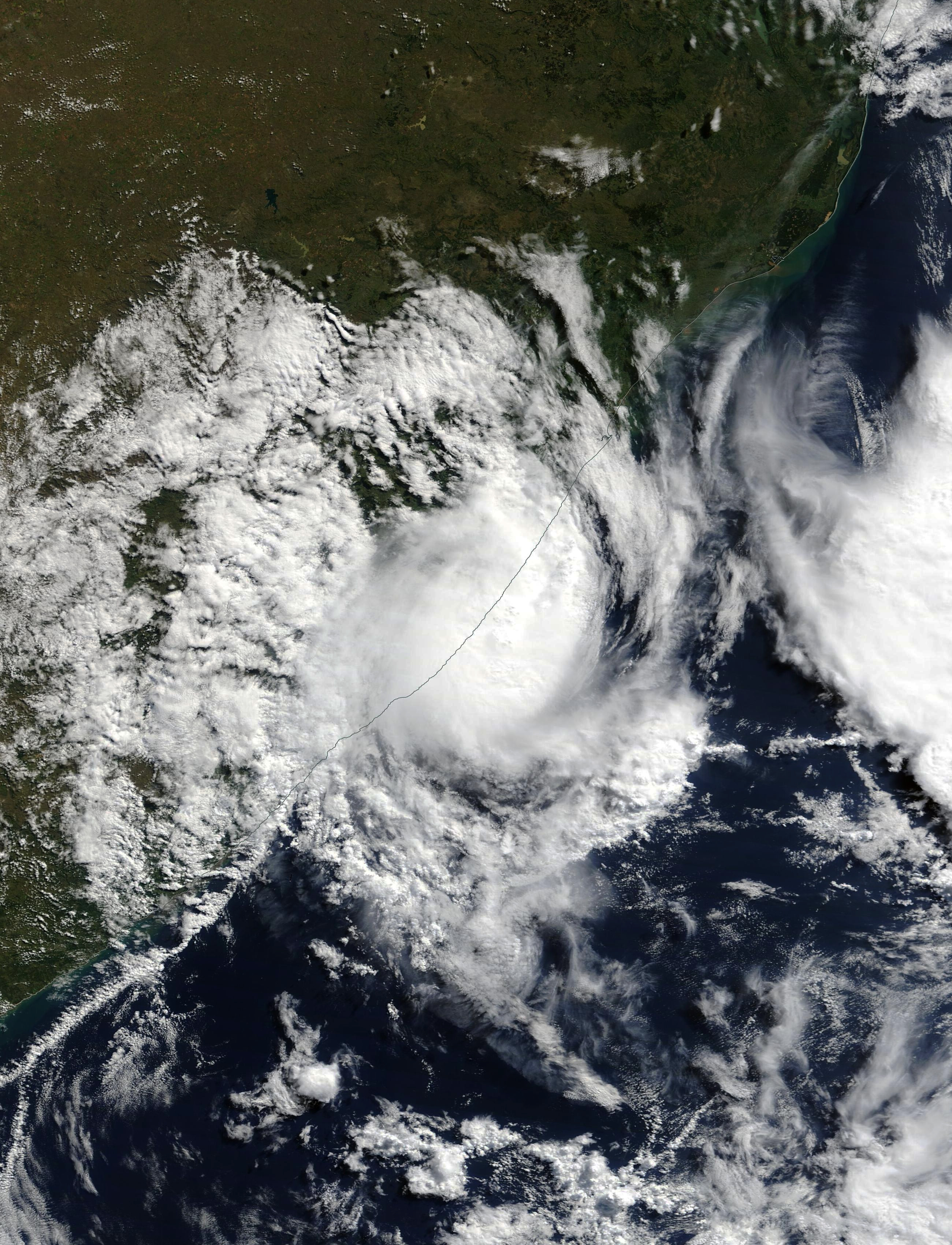
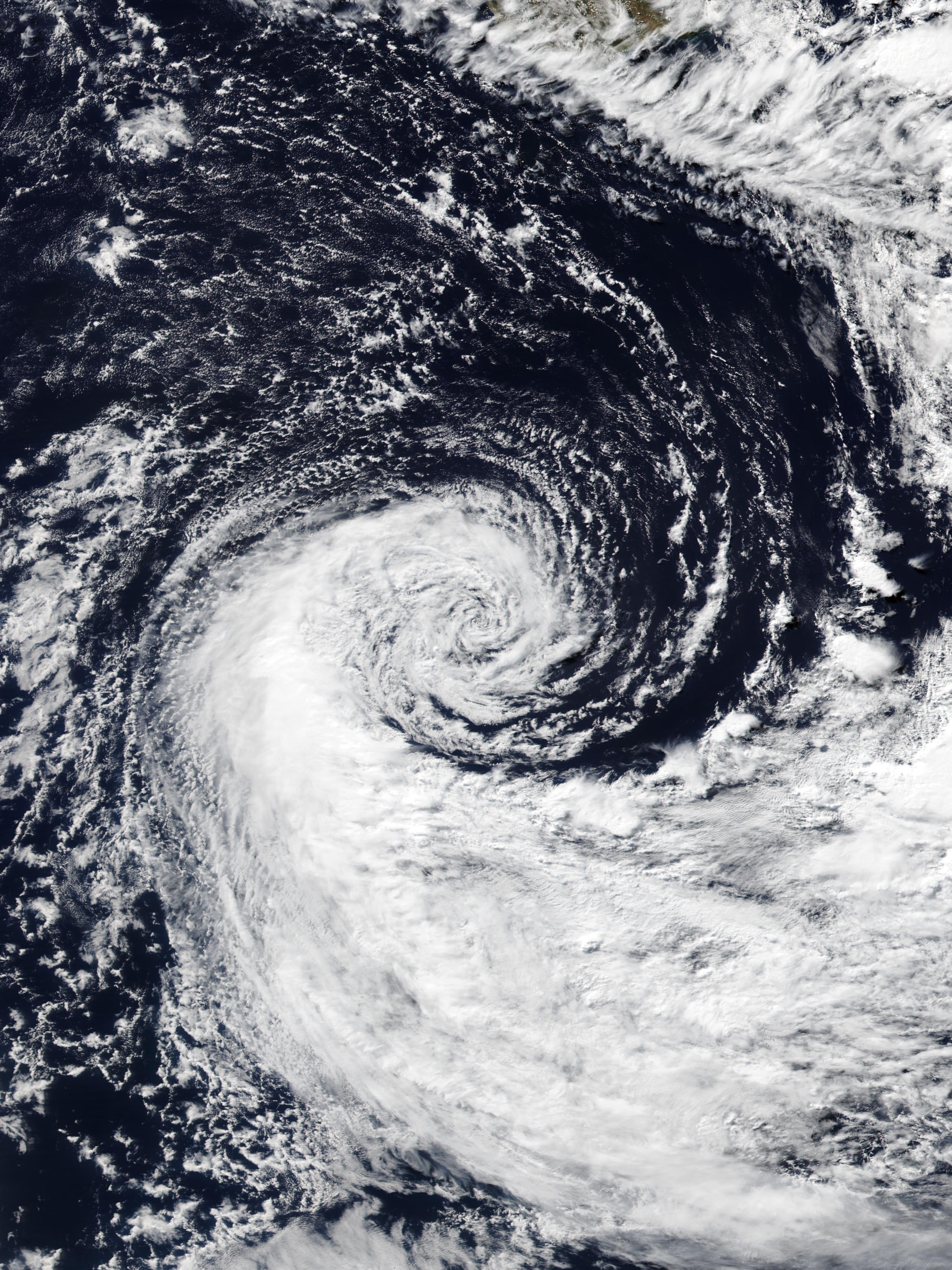
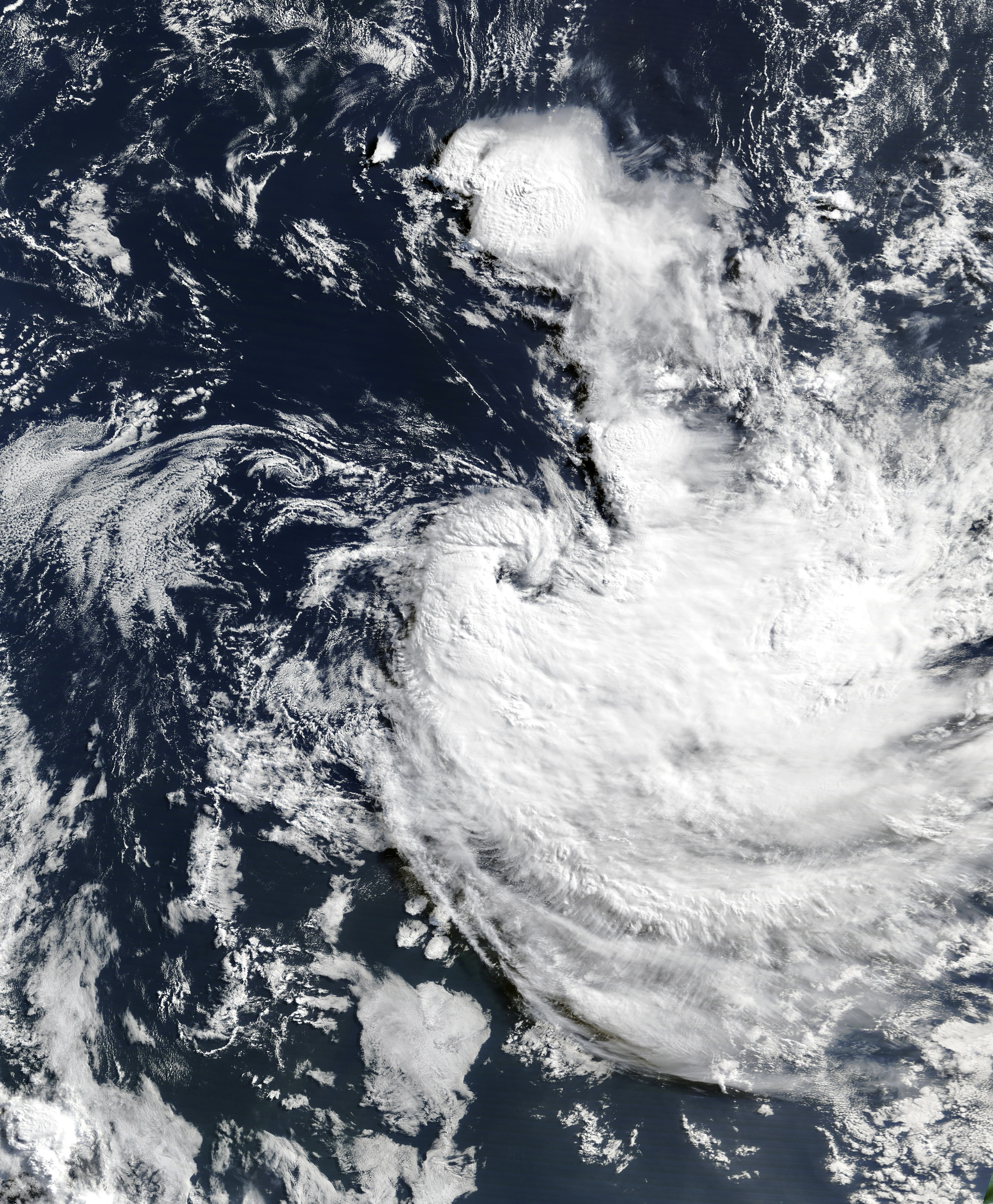
Subtropical Depression Luma (far left), Subtropical Depression Issa (left-center), Subtropical Storm Kanto (right-center), and Subtropical Storm Juluka (far right), the only four named subtropical cyclones in the South-West Indian Ocean basin

In the South-West Indian Ocean, Météo-France La Réunion (MFR) names subtropical cyclones once winds reach moderate tropical storm or gale force near the low-pressure center’s significant portion of the cyclonic circulation, with this policy being enacted starting the 2024–25 season. Subtropical Storm Kanto in 2025 and Subtropical Storm Juluka in 2026 are the only named subtropical cyclones in the South-West Indian Ocean basin following the implementation of this policy, a Subtropical Depression was noted by MFR in June 2026 but was never formally indexed or numbered. Prior to the enacting of this naming policy, Subtropical Depression Issa was named by MFR in 2022 and Subtropical Depression Luma was named by Météo Madagascar in 2003 which has unofficially been considered to have reached hurricane-equivalent intensity as a subtropical cyclone.

Since 2011, subtropical storms in the western south Atlantic Ocean are named by the Brazilian Navy Hydrographic Center.

== Formation ==
A water vapor loop showing the formation of Subtropical Storm Andrea in May 2007

Subtropical cyclones can form in a wide band of latitude, mainly south of the 50th parallel in the Northern Hemisphere, and north of the 50th parallel in the Southern Hemisphere. Due to the increased frequency of cyclones which cut off from the main belt of the westerlies during the summer and fall, subtropical cyclones are significantly more frequent across the north Atlantic than the northwestern Pacific Ocean. In the eastern half of the north Pacific Ocean and north Indian Ocean, the older subtropical cyclone definition term is still used, which requires a weak circulation forming underneath a mid to upper-tropospheric low which has cut off from the main belt of the westerlies during the cold season (winter), similar to the north Atlantic and southwest Indian Ocean. In the case of the north Indian Ocean, the formation of this type of vortex leads to the onset of monsoon rains during the wet season. In the Southern Hemisphere, subtropical cyclones are regularly observed across southern portions of the Mozambique Channel.

Most subtropical cyclones form when a deep cold-core extratropical cyclone drops down into the subtropics. The system becomes blocked by a high latitude ridge, and eventually sheds its frontal boundaries as its source of cool and dry air from the high latitudes diverts away from the system, and warms the central circulation, allowing further transition. Temperature differences between the 500 hPa pressure level and the sea surface temperatures initially exceed the dry adiabatic lapse rate, which causes an initial round of thunderstorms to form at a distance east of the center. Due to the initial cold temperatures aloft, sea surface temperatures usually need to reach at least 20 °C (68 °F) for this initial round of thunderstorms. The initial thunderstorm activity humidifies the environment around the low-pressure system, which destabilizes the atmosphere by reducing the lapse rate needed for convection. When the next shortwave or upper-level jet streak (wind maximum within the jet stream) moves nearby, the convection reignites closer to the center, which warms the core and develops the system into a true subtropical cyclone. The average sea surface temperature that helps lead to subtropical cyclogenesis is 24 °C (75 °F). If the thunderstorm activity becomes deep and persistent, allowing its initial low level warm core to deepen, extension to tropical cyclogenesis is possible. The locus of formation for north Atlantic subtropical cyclones is out in the open ocean; the island of Bermuda is regularly impacted by these systems.

The south Atlantic environment for formation of subtropical cyclones has both stronger vertical wind shear and lower sea surface temperatures, yet subtropical cyclogenesis is regularly observed in the open ocean in the south Atlantic. A second mechanism for formation has been diagnosed for south Atlantic subtropical cyclones: lee cyclogenesis in the region of the Brazil Current.

Subtropical cyclone formation is extremely rare in the far southeastern Pacific Ocean, due to the cold sea-surface temperatures generated by the Humboldt Current and unfavorable wind shear. In late April 2015, a rare subtropical cyclone was identified to have formed in this region. This system was unofficially dubbed Katie by researchers. Another subtropical cyclone was identified at 77.8 degrees longitude in May 2018, just off the coast of Chile. This system was unofficially named Lexi by researchers. A subtropical cyclone was spotted just off the Chilean coast in January 2022, given the unofficial name Humberto.

=== Transition from extratropical ===
By gaining tropical characteristics, an extratropical low may transition into a subtropical depression or storm. A subtropical depression/storm may further gain tropical characteristics to become a pure tropical depression or storm, which may eventually develop into a hurricane, and there are at least ten cases of tropical cyclones transforming into a subtropical cyclone in the Atlantic (Tropical Storm Gilda in 1973, Subtropical Storm Four in 1974, Hurricane Amy in 1975, Tropical Storm Jose in 1981, Hurricane Klaus in 1984, Tropical Storm Allison in 2001, Tropical Storm Lee in 2011, Hurricane Humberto in 2013, Tropical Storm Ian in 2016, and Hurricane Debby in 2024). The JTWC has recognised many cases of this, with examples including Typhoon Jelawat in 2018 and Typhoon Surigae in 2021. There has also only been one recorded case of a storm transitioning from tropical to extratropical back to a subtropical cyclone; only seen with the Caribbean–Azores hurricane in 1970. Generally, a tropical storm or tropical depression is not called subtropical while it is becoming extratropical and vice versa, after hitting either land or colder waters. This transition normally requires significant instability through the atmosphere, with temperature differences between the underlying ocean and the mid-levels of the troposphere requiring over 38 °C, or 68 °F, of contrast in this roughly 5,900 meters (19,400 ft) layer of the lower atmosphere. The mode of the sea surface temperatures that subtropical cyclones form over is 23 °C (73 °F). Transition from subtropical cyclones into fully tropical cyclones occurs only in very rare cases over the south Atlantic Ocean, such as Hurricane Catarina in 2004.

== Characteristics ==
Subtropical Cyclone One in 1979 is one of only two subtropical cyclones in the north Atlantic to reach hurricane-equivalent intensity.

=== Intensity and Classification ===
Subtropical cyclones can have maximum winds extending farther from the center than in a purely tropical cyclone and have no weather fronts linking directly to the center of circulation. In the Atlantic Basin, the United States NOAA classifies subtropical cyclones similarly to tropical cyclones, based on maximum sustained surface winds. Those with winds below 18 m/s, (65 km/h, 35 knots, or 39 mph) are called subtropical depressions, while those at or above this speed are referred to as subtropical storms. Diagrams which depict a cyclone's phase depict subtropical cyclones with a shallow warm core and as asymmetric systems, similar to tropical cyclones which have begun the transition to an extratropical cyclone.

Subtropical cyclones with hurricane-force winds of 33 m/s, (119 km/h, 64 knots, or 74 mph) or greater are no longer recognized by the National Hurricane Center. Once a subtropical storm intensifies enough to have hurricane-force winds, it is then automatically assumed to have become a fully tropical hurricane even if it still has subtropical characteristics. Despite this however, prior to the start of modern policies in the Atlantic there were two subtropical cyclones, one in 1968 and another in 1979, that attained hurricane-force winds while subtropical. In addition, three systems, Subtropical Depression 11 during the 2000–01 South-West Indian Ocean cyclone season, Subtropical Depression Luma during 2002–03 South-West Indian Ocean cyclone season, and Cyclone Kevin during the 2022–23 South Pacific cyclone season were analyzed by the Joint Typhoon Warning Center (JTWC) to have reached hurricane strength as a subtropical cyclone, but Météo-France (MFR) only considers 11 and Luma to have been subtropical depressions and MetService only considers Kevin to have been a subtropical storm.

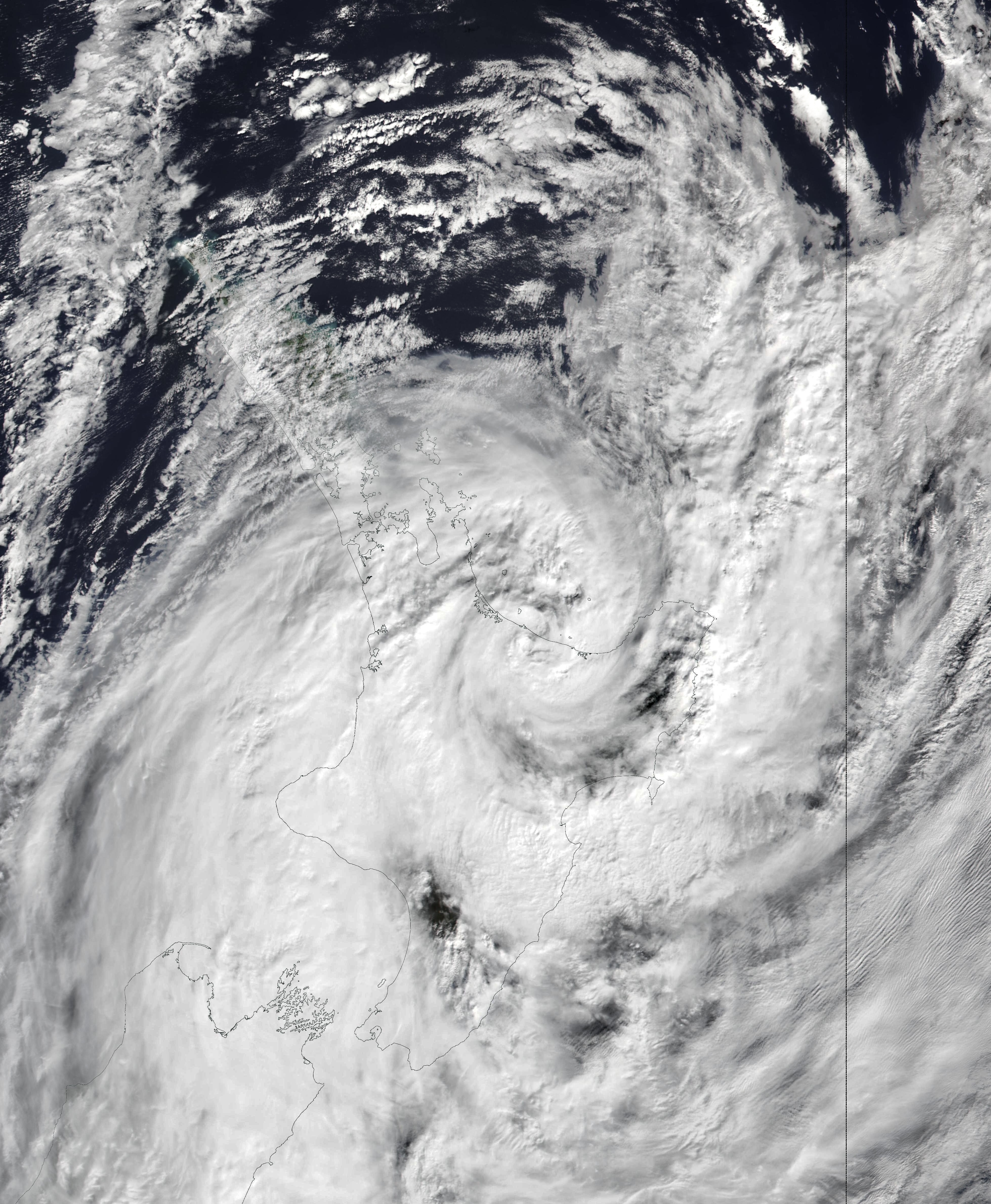
Cyclone Vaianu in 2026 as a subtropical storm making landfall in North Island, New Zealand

The Joint Typhoon Warning Center analyzes subtropical cyclones based off a cyclone phase classification worksheet based on a generated list of 13 observable criteria related to cyclone phase which is associated with near real-time data.

- Total Precipitable Water (TPW)
- Symmetry of the low-level circulation center (LLCC)
- Radius of maximum wind (RMW)
- Symmetry of the low-level (850 mb) vorticity signature
- Low-level (850 mb) maximum vorticity
- Deep convection structure
- Size of the convective envelope
- Vertical wind shear
- Sea surface temperature (SST)
- Baroclinicity
- Core temperature anomaly
- Low-level circulation position relative to the mid-level (500 mb) subtropical ridge axis
- Low-level circulation position relative to the upper-level low

Based on the criterion, this allows the JTWC to assign a numerical value to each criteria with the value bin ranging from -3 (characteristics of extratropical cyclones) to +3 (characteristics of tropical cyclones). The total score ranges then correspond to five cyclone phase categories.

- Extratropical (-18/18 to -7/18)
- Borderline Extratropical/Subtropical (-7/18 to -5/18)
- Subtropical (-5/18 to 5/26)
- Borderline Subtropical/Tropical (5/26 to 7/26)
- Tropical (7/26 to 26/26)

The cyclone phase classification method’s design allows the JTWC to reduce ambiguity and increase consistency on extratropical, subtropical, or tropical cyclone phase classification. Disturbances seen as “subtropical in nature” are required to be designated as invests and is subsequently determined its cyclone phase using the classification worksheet. The environmental conditions and structure of subtropical invests are usually described in significant tropical weather advisories by the JTWC if either transition to a tropical cyclone is anticipated or the subtropical invest meets or exceeds the tropical cyclone warning threshold: 25 kt (30 mph) in the Western Pacific and 35 kt (40 mph) in the Indian Ocean and South Pacific. If the subtropical invest is anticipated to transition to a tropical cyclone that will meet warning criteria within 24 hours, a Tropical Cyclone Formation Alert (TCFA) will be issued.

=== Examples during the North Atlantic off-season ===
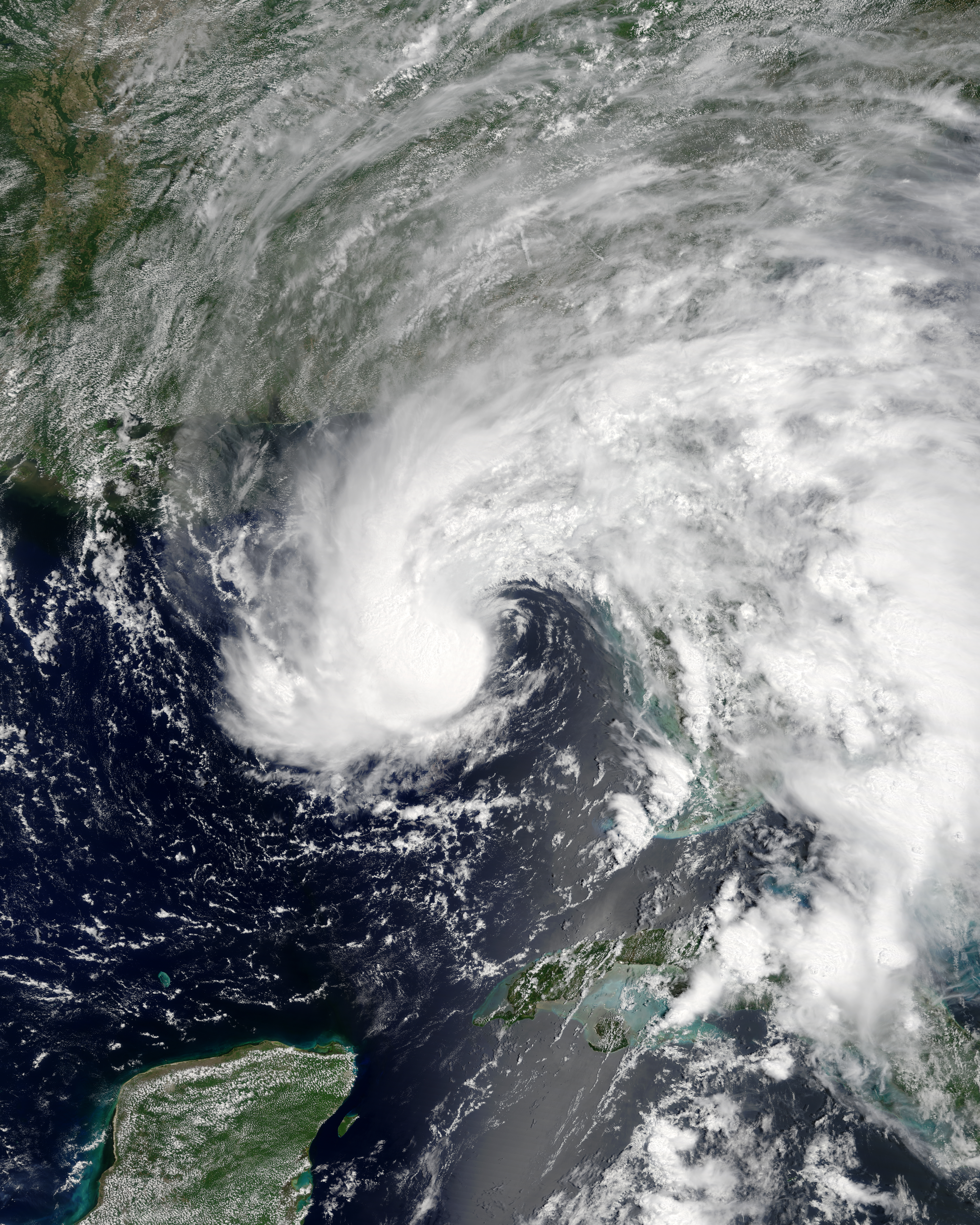
Subtropical Storm Alberto near Florida on May 27, 2018.

Subtropical cyclones are more likely than tropical cyclones to form outside of a region's designated hurricane season. Examples during the 21st century in the north Atlantic include:

- Subtropical Storm Ana (which became Tropical Storm Ana) in late-April of the 2003 hurricane season.
- Tropical Storm Peter in early-December of the 2003 hurricane season was found to have initially been subtropical in post-analysis.
- Subtropical Storm Andrea in early-May of the 2007 hurricane season.
- Subtropical Storm Olga (which became Tropical Storm Olga) in mid-December of the 2007 hurricane season.
- Subtropical Storm Beryl (which became Tropical Storm Beryl) in late-May of the 2012 hurricane season.
- An unnamed subtropical storm in early-December of the 2013 hurricane season.
- Subtropical Storm Ana (which became Tropical Storm Ana) in early-May of the 2015 hurricane season.
- Subtropical Storm Alex (which became Hurricane Alex) in mid-January of the 2016 hurricane season.
- Subtropical Depression One (which became Tropical Storm Arlene) in mid-April of the 2017 hurricane season.
- Subtropical Storm Alberto (which became Tropical Storm Alberto) in late-May of the 2018 hurricane season.
- Subtropical Storm Andrea in late-May of the 2019 hurricane season.
- Subtropical Storm Ana (which became Tropical Storm Ana) in late-May of the 2021 hurricane season.
- An unnamed subtropical storm in mid-January of the 2023 hurricane season.

== Types ==
=== Upper-level low ===
The most common type of subtropical storm is an upper-level cold low with circulation extending to the surface layer and maximum sustained winds generally occurring at a radius of about 160 kilometers (99 mi) or more from the center. In comparison to tropical cyclones, such systems have a relatively wide zone of maximum winds that is located further from the center, and typically have a less symmetric wind field and distribution of convection.

=== Mesoscale low ===
A second type of subtropical cyclone is a mesoscale low originating in or near a frontolyzing zone of horizontal wind shear, also known as a "dying" frontal zone, with radius of maximum sustained winds generally less than 50 kilometers (31 mi). The entire circulation may initially have a diameter of less than 160 kilometers (99 mi). These generally short-lived systems may be either cold core or warm core, and in 1972 this type of subtropical cyclone was ephemerally referred to as a "neutercane".

== Kona storm ==
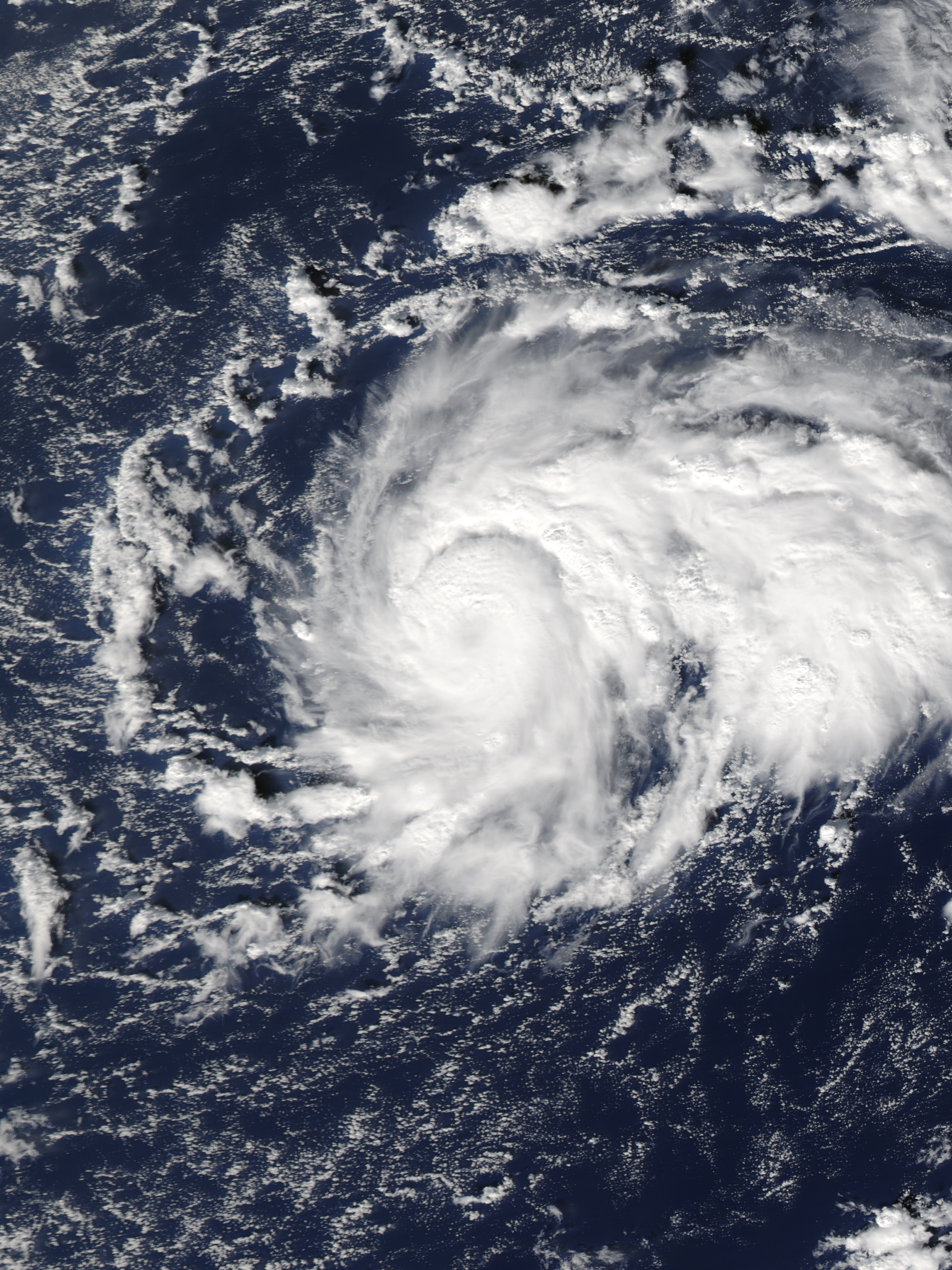
Subtropical Storm Omeka in December 2010, originally a Kona storm

Kona storms (or Kona lows) are deep cyclones that form during the cool winter season of the central Pacific Ocean. A definition change in the term during the early 1970s makes categorization of the systems more complex, as many kona lows are extratropical cyclones, complete with their own weather fronts. Those across the northeast Pacific Ocean consider them subtropical cyclones as long as a weak surface circulation is present. Kona is a Hawaiian term for leeward, which explains the change in wind direction for the Hawaiian Islands from easterly to southerly when this type of cyclone is present.

== Australian east coast lows ==
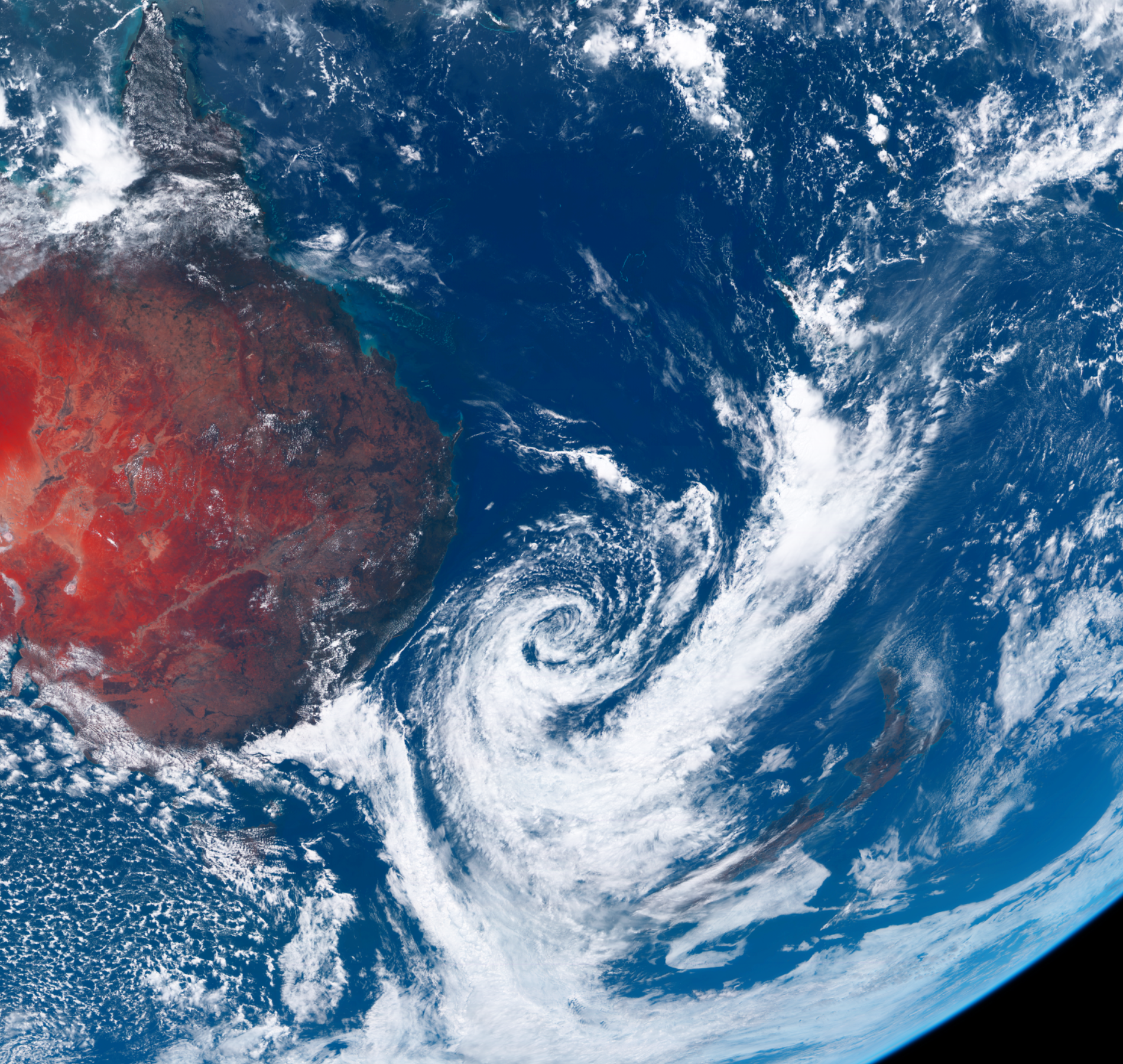
An Australian east coast low off the New South Wales coast on 22 February 2021. (Himawari 8)

Australian east coast lows (known locally as east coast lows and sometimes as east coast cyclones) are extratropical cyclones, the most intense of these systems have many of the characteristics of subtropical cyclones. They develop between 25° south and 40° south and within 5° of the Australian coastline, also typically during the winter months. Each year there are about ten "significant impact" maritime lows. Explosive cyclogenesis is seen on average just once per year, but these storms cause significant wind and flood damage when they occur. Australian east coast cyclones vary in size from mesoscale (approximately 10 km to 100 km) to synoptic scale (approximately 100 km to 1,000 km). These storms which mostly affect the southeast coast should not be confused with Australian region tropical cyclones which typically affect the northern half of the continent instead.

== Mediterranean tropical-like cyclones ==
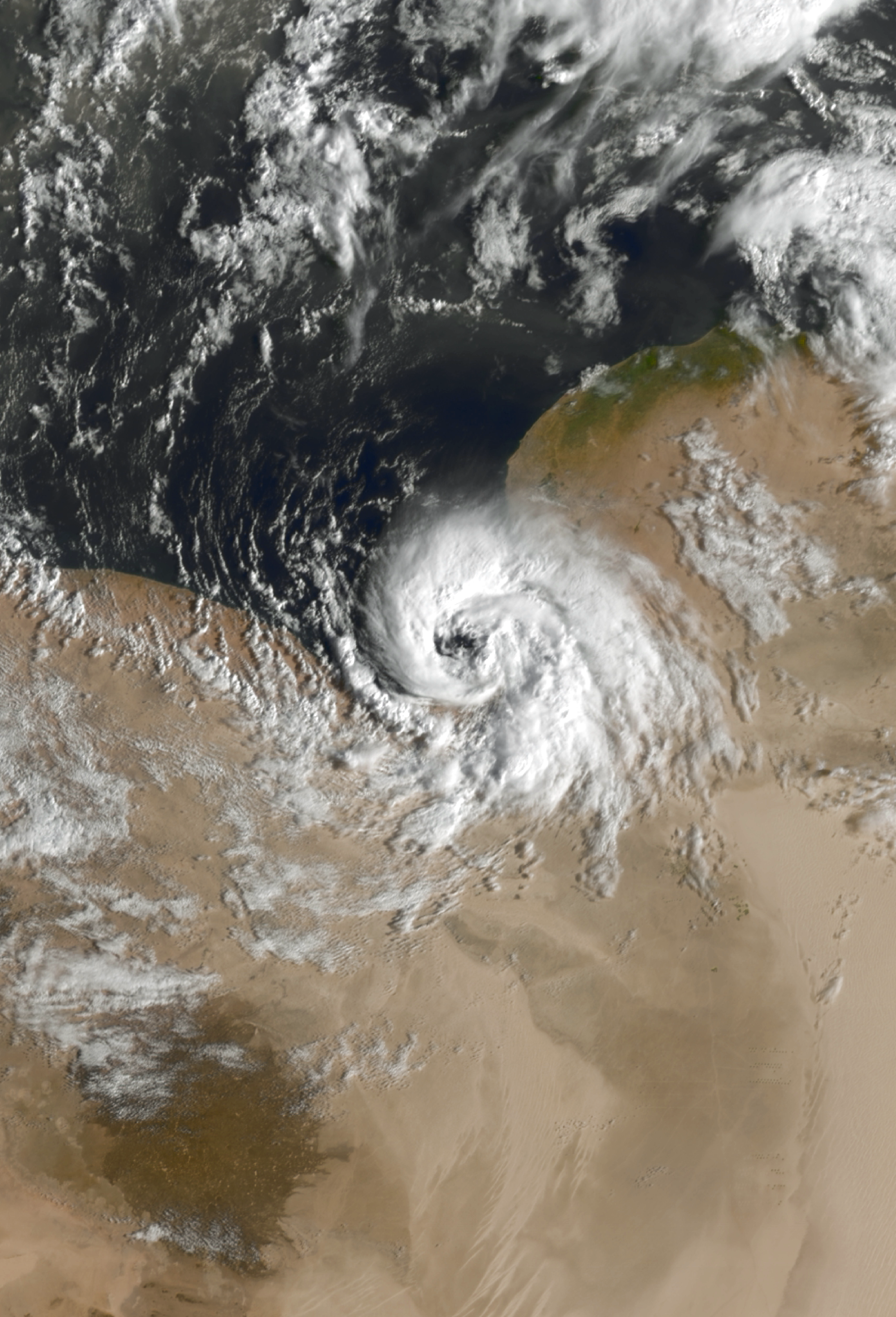
Medicane Samuel is an example of a Mediterranean tropical-like cyclone; featuring characteristics similar to both a tropical and extratropical cyclone

A Mediterranean tropical-like cyclone (also known as a Medicane) is a mesoscale cyclone that develops over the Mediterranean Sea and displays tropical-like cyclone characteristics; a warm core extending into the upper troposphere, an eye-like feature in its center with spiral cloud bands around an almost windless center surrounded by nearly symmetric sea-surface wind circulation with maximum wind speed within a few tens of km from the center. The development of medicanes can usually only occur under somewhat unusual and hybrid circumstances. Low wind shear and atmospheric instability induced by incursions of cold air are often required. A majority of medicanes are also accompanied by upper-level troughs similar to that required by some subtropical cyclones, providing energy required for intensifying atmospheric convection—thunderstorms—and heavy precipitation. The baroclinic properties of the Mediterranean region, with high temperature gradients, also provides necessary instability for the formation of tropical or subtropical cyclones. Another factor, rising cool air, provides necessary moisture as well. Warm sea surface temperatures (SST’s) are mostly unnecessary, however, as most medicanes' energy are derived from warmer air temperatures. When these favorable circumstances coincide, the genesis of warm-core Mediterranean tropical cyclones, often from within existing cut-off cold-core lows, is possible in a conducive environment for formation. Medicanes can form into tropical cyclones but usually undergo a hybrid tropical and extratropical cyclogenesis process in order to form into one.

== See also ==
- Hybrid low (disambiguation)
- Extratropical transition technique
- Mediterranean tropical-like cyclone
- Australian east coast low
- Polar low
- Subtropical Cyclone Katie
- Subtropical Storm Alpha (2020)
- Tropical cyclone
- Extratropical cyclone
