= Mediterranean tropical-like cyclone =

Hurricane-like storms in the Mediterranean Sea

Summary map of most recognized Mediterranean tropical and subtropical cyclones from 1995–2026

Mediterranean tropical-like cyclones, often referred to as Mediterranean cyclones or Mediterranean hurricanes, and shortened as medicanes, are meteorological phenomena occasionally observed over the Mediterranean Sea. On a few rare occasions, some storms have been observed reaching the strength of a Category 1 hurricane on the Saffir–Simpson scale, and Medicane Ianos in 2020 was recorded reaching Category 2 intensity. The main societal hazard posed by medicanes is not usually from destructive winds, but through life-threatening torrential rains and flash floods.

The occurrence of medicanes has been described as not particularly rare. Tropical-like systems were first identified in the Mediterranean basin in the 1980s, when widespread satellite coverage showing tropical-looking low pressures which formed a cyclonic eye in the center were identified. Due to the dry nature of the Mediterranean region, the formation of tropical, subtropical cyclones and tropical-like cyclones is infrequent and also hard to detect, in particular with the reanalysis of past data. Depending on the search algorithms used, different long-term surveys of satellite era and pre-satellite era data came up with 67 tropical-like cyclones of tropical storm intensity or higher between 1947 and 2014, and around 100 recorded tropical-like storms between 1947 and 2011. More consensus exists about the long term temporal and spatial distribution of tropical-like cyclones: they form predominantly over the western and central Mediterranean Sea while the area east of Crete is almost devoid of tropical-like cyclones. The development of tropical-like cyclones can occur year-round, with activity historically peaking between the months of September and January, while the counts for the summer months of June and July are the lowest, being within the peak dry season of the Mediterranean with stable air.

== Meteorological classification and history ==
Historically, the term tropical-like cyclone was coined in the 1980s to unofficially distinguish tropical cyclones developing outside the tropics (like in the Mediterranean Basin) from those developing inside the tropics. The term tropical-like was in no way meant to indicate a hybrid cyclone exhibiting characteristics not usually seen in "true" tropical cyclones. In their matured stages, Mediterranean tropical cyclones show no difference from other tropical storms. Mediterranean hurricanes or medicanes are therefore not different from hurricanes elsewhere.

Mediterranean tropical-like cyclones are not considered to be formally classified tropical cyclones and their region of formation is not officially monitored by any agency with meteorological tasks. However, the NOAA subsidiary Satellite Analysis Branch released information related to a medicane in November 2011 while it was active, which they dubbed as "Tropical Storm 01M", though they ceased services in the Mediterranean on 16 December 2011 for undisclosed reasons. However, in 2015, the NOAA resumed services in the Mediterranean region; by 2016, the NOAA was issuing advisories on a new tropical system, Tropical Storm 90M. Since 2005, ESTOFEX has been issuing bulletins that can include tropical-like cyclones, among others. No agency with meteorological tasks, however, is officially responsible for monitoring the formation and development of medicanes, as well as for their naming.

Despite all this, the whole Mediterranean Sea lies within the Greek area of responsibility with the Hellenic National Meteorological Service (HNMS) as the governing agency, while France's Météo-France serves as a "preparation service" for the western part of the Mediterranean as well. As the only official agency covering the whole Mediterranean Sea, HNMS publications are of particular interest for the classification of medicanes. HNMS calls the meteorological phenomenon Mediterranean tropical-like Hurricane in its annual bulletin and – by also using the respective portmanteau word medicane – makes the term medicane quasi-official. In a joint article with the Laboratory of Climatology and Atmospheric Environment of the University of Athens, the Hellenic National Meteorological Service outlines conditions to consider a cyclone over the Mediterranean Sea a Medicane:

The criteria applied in order to identify medicanes concern the detailed structure, the size and the lifetime of the systems using Meteosat satellite images in the infrared channel. They must have a continuous cloud cover and symmetric shape around a clearly visible cyclone eye.

— Hellenic National Meteorological Service

In the same article, a survey of 37 medicanes revealed that medicanes could have a well-defined cyclone eye at estimated maximum sustained winds between 47 and 180 km/h (29 and 112 mph; 25 and 97 kn), with the lower end being exceptionally low for warm core cyclones. Medicanes can indeed develop well-defined eyes at such low maximum sustained winds of around 48 km/h (30 mph; 26 kn) as could be seen for a 22 October 2015 medicane near the Albanian coast. This is much lower than the lower threshold for eye development in tropical systems in the Atlantic Ocean which seems to be close to 80 km/h (50 mph; 43 kn), well below hurricane-force winds.

Several notable and damaging medicanes are known to have occurred. In September 1969, a North African Mediterranean tropical cyclone produced flooding that killed nearly 600 individuals, left 250,000 homeless, and crippled local economies. A medicane in September 1996 that developed in the Balearic Islands region spawned six tornadoes, and inundated parts of the islands. Several medicanes have also been subject to extensive study, such as those of January 1982, January 1995, September 2006, November 2011, and November 2014. The January 1995 storm is one of the best-studied Mediterranean tropical cyclones, with its close resemblance to tropical cyclones elsewhere and availability of observations. The medicane of September 2006, meanwhile, is well-studied, due to the availability of existing observations and data.

Given the low profile of HNMS in forecasting and classifying tropical-like systems in the Mediterranean, a proper classification system for Mediterranean tropical-like cyclones does not exist. The HNMS criterion of a cyclonic eye for considering a system a medicane is usually valid for a system at peak strength, often only hours before landfall, which is not suitable at least for forecasts and warnings.

Unofficially, Deutscher Wetterdienst (DWD, the German meteorological service) proposed a system to forecast and classify tropical-like cyclones based on the NHC classification for the northern Atlantic Ocean. To account for the broader wind field and the larger radius of maximum winds of tropical-like systems in the Mediterranean (see the section Development and characteristics below), DWD is suggesting a lower threshold of 112 km/h (70 mph; 60 kn) for the use of the term medicane in the Mediterranean instead of 119 km/h (74 mph; 64 kn) as suggested by the Saffir–Simpson scale for Atlantic hurricanes. The DWD proposal and also US-based forecasts (NHC, NOAA, NRL etc.) use one-minute sustained winds while European-based forecasts use ten-minute sustained winds which makes a difference of roughly 14% in measurements. The distinction is also of direct practical use (for example for a comparison of NOAA bulletins with EUMETSAT, ESTOFEX and HNMS bulletins). To account for the difference, the DWD proposal is shown below for both one-minute and deduced ten-minute sustained winds (see tropical cyclone scales for conversions):

maximum sustained winds	Mediterranean Tropical Depression	Mediterranean Tropical Storm	Medicane
1-minute average	≤ 62 km/h (≤ 17 m/s; ≤ 38 mph; ≤ 33 knots)	63–111 km/h (18–30 m/s; 39–69 mph; 34–60 knots)	≥ 112 km/h (≥ 31 m/s; ≥ 70 mph; ≥ 61 knots)
10-minute average	≤ 54 km/h (≤ 14 m/s; ≤ 33 mph; ≤ 29 knots)	56–98 km/h (15–27 m/s; 35–61 mph; 30–53 knots)	≥ 99 km/h (≥ 28 m/s; ≥ 62 mph; ≥ 54 knots)

Another proposal uses roughly the same scale but suggests to use the term medicane for tropical storm force cyclones and major medicane for hurricane force cyclones. Both proposals would fit the observation, that half of the 37 cyclones surveyed by HNMS with a clearly observable hurricane-like eye, as the major criterion for assigning the medicane status, showed maximum sustained winds between 76–110 km/h (47–68 mph; 41–59 kn), while another quarter of the medicanes peaked at lower wind speeds.

Due to the lack of a proper definition and discrepancies over the classification of a Mediterranean tropical-like cyclone, most commonly accepted to be a relative area of vorticity with satellite-observed characteristics typical of tropical cyclones, the lack of a proper definition has caused confusion among those in the scientific and operational community. To better define and describe the definition of a Medicane, a paper published by European experts from the American Meteorological Society on 1 September, 2025 aimed to reconcile inconsistent Medicane phenomena and structural criteria that has been applied amongst a multitude of past studies and papers, with this definition stating;

A medicane is a mesoscale cyclone that develops over the Mediterranean Sea and displays tropical-like cyclone characteristics: a warm core extending into the upper troposphere, an eye-like feature in its center with spiral cloud bands around an almost windless center surrounded by nearly symmetric sea-surface wind circulation with maximum wind speed within a few tens of km from the center.

— American Meteorological Society

This definition provided by the paper assures consistency upon solving confusion in the scientific community and in operational weather services in regards to the classification of a Mediterranean tropical-like cyclone, as well as being used as a reference for future scientific research or operational application.

== Climatology ==
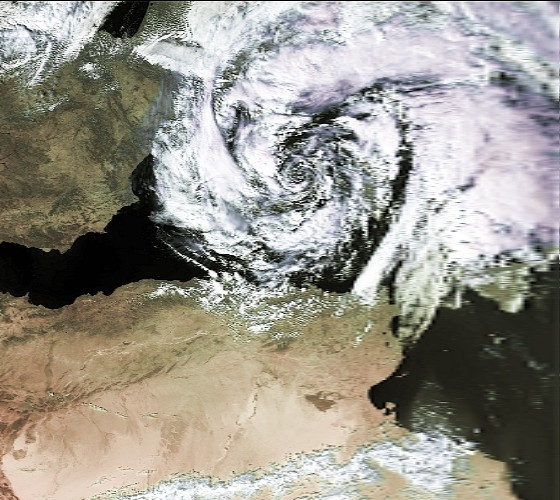
Visible satellite imagery of a "medicane" above the Balearic Islands on 7 October 1996

A majority of Mediterranean tropical cyclones (tropical cyclogenesis) form over two separate regions. The first, more conducive for development than the other, encompasses an area of the western Mediterranean bordered by the Balearic Islands, southern France, and the shorelines of the islands of Corsica and Sardinia. The second identified region of development, in the Ionian Sea between Sicily and Greece and stretching south to Libya, is less favorable for tropical cyclogenesis. An additional two regions, in the Aegean and Adriatic seas, produce fewer medicanes, while activity is minimal in the Levantine region. The geographical distribution of Mediterranean tropical-like cyclones is markedly different from that of other cyclones, with the formation of regular cyclones centering on the Pyrenees and Atlas mountain ranges, the Gulf of Genoa, and in the Ionian Sea. Although meteorological factors are most advantageous in the Adriatic and Aegean seas, the closed nature of the region's geography, bordered by land, allows little time for further evolution.

The geography of mountain ranges bordering the Mediterranean are conducive for severe weather and thunderstorms, with the sloped nature of mountainous regions permitting the development of convective activity. Although the geography of the Mediterranean region, as well as its dry air, typically prevent the formation of tropical cyclones, when certain meteorological circumstances arise, difficulties influenced by the region's geography are overcome. The occurrence of tropical cyclones in the Mediterranean Sea is generally extremely rare, with an average of 1.57 forming annually and merely 99 recorded occurrences of tropical-like storms discovered between 1948 and 2011 in a modern study, with no definitive trend in activity in that period. Few medicanes form during the summer season, though activity typically rises in autumn, peaks in January, and gradually decreases from February to May. In the western Mediterranean region of development, approximately 0.75 such systems form each year, compared with 0.32 in the Ionian Sea region. However, on very rare occasions, similar tropical-like storms may also develop in the Black Sea.

Studies have evaluated that global warming can result in higher observed intensities of tropical cyclones as a result of deviations in the surface energy flux and atmospheric composition, which both heavily influence the development of medicanes as well. In tropical and subtropical areas, sea surface temperatures (SSTs) rose 0.2 °C (0.36 °F) within a 50-year period, and in the North Atlantic and Northwestern Pacific tropical cyclone basins, the potential destructiveness and energy of storms nearly doubled within the same duration, evidencing a clear correlation between global warming and tropical cyclone intensities. Within a similarly recent 20-year period, SSTs in the Mediterranean Sea increased by 0.6 to 1 °C (1.1 to 1.8 °F), though no observable increase in medicane activity has been noted, as of 2013. In 2006, a computer-driven atmospheric model evaluated the future frequency of Mediterranean cyclones between 2071 and 2100, projecting a decrease in autumn, winter, and spring cyclonic activity coinciding with a dramatic increase in formation near Cyprus, with both scenarios attributed to elevated temperatures as a result of global warming. In another study, researchers found that more tropical-like storms in the Mediterranean could reach Category 1 strength by the end of the 21st century, with most of the stronger storms appearing in the autumn, though the models indicated that some storms could potentially reach Category 2 intensity. Other studies, however, have been inconclusive, forecasting both increases and decreases in duration, number, and intensity. Three independent studies, using different methodologies and data, evaluated that while medicane activity would likely decline with a rate depending on the climate scenario considered, a higher percentage of those that formed would be of greater strength.

== Development and characteristics ==
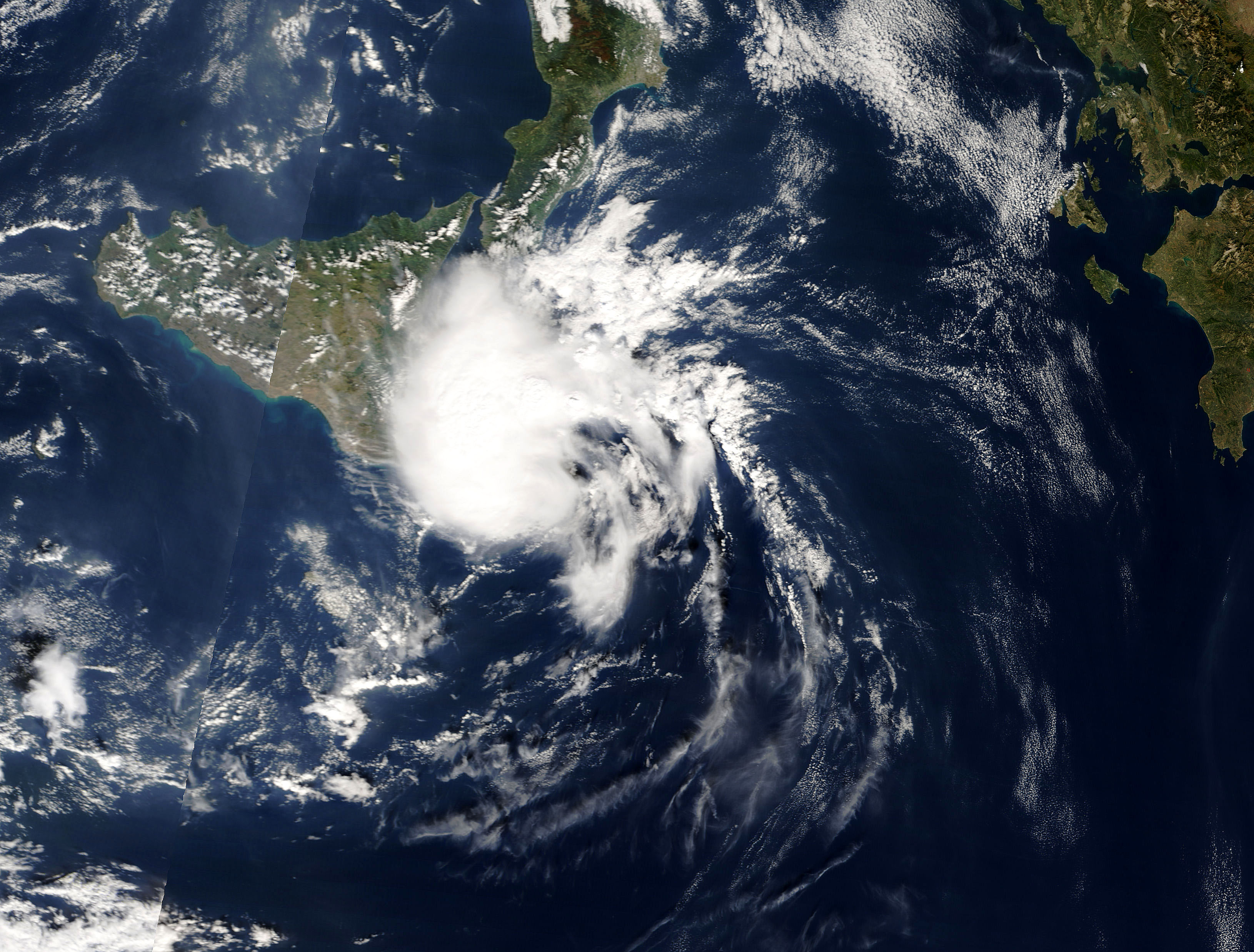
A Mediterranean tropical-like cyclone south of Italy, on 27 October 2005

The development of tropical or subtropical cyclones in the Mediterranean Sea can usually only occur under somewhat unusual circumstances. Low wind shear and atmospheric instability induced by incursions of cold air are often required. A majority of medicanes are also accompanied by upper-level troughs, providing energy required for intensifying atmospheric convection—thunderstorms—and heavy precipitation. The baroclinic properties of the Mediterranean region, with high temperature gradients, also provides necessary instability for the formation of tropical cyclones. Another factor, rising cool air, provides necessary moisture as well. Warm sea surface temperatures (SSTs) are mostly unnecessary, however, as most medicanes' energy are derived from warmer air temperatures. When these favorable circumstances coincide, the genesis of warm-core Mediterranean tropical cyclones, often from within existing cut-off cold-core lows, is possible in a conducive environment for formation.

Factors required for the formation of medicanes are somewhat different from that normally expected of tropical cyclones; known to emerge over regions with sea surface temperatures (SSTs) below 26 °C (79 °F), Mediterranean tropical cyclones often require incursions of colder air to induce atmospheric instability. A majority of medicanes develop above regions of the Mediterranean with SSTs of 15 to 26 °C (59 to 79 °F), with the upper bound only found in the southernmost reaches of the sea. Despite the low sea surface temperatures, the instability incited by cold atmospheric air within a baroclinic zone—regions with high differences in temperature and pressure—permits the formation of medicanes, in contrast with tropical areas lacking high baroclinity, where raised SSTs are needed. While significant deviations in air temperature have been noted around the time of Mediterranean tropical cyclones' formation, few anomalies in sea surface temperature coincide with their development, indicating that the formation of medicanes is primarily controlled by higher air temperatures, not by anomalous SSTs. Similar to tropical cyclones, minimal wind shear—difference in wind speed and direction over a region—as well as abundant moisture and vorticity encourages the genesis of tropical cyclone-like systems in the Mediterranean Sea.

Satellite image of Medicane Zeo near Crete on 15 December 2005

Due to the confined character of the Mediterranean and the limited capability of heat fluxes — in the case of medicanes, air-sea heat transfer — tropical cyclones with a diameter larger than 300 km (190 mi) cannot exist within the Mediterranean. Despite being a relatively baroclinic area with high temperature gradients, the primary energy source utilized by Mediterranean tropical cyclones is derived from underlying heat sources generated by the presence of convection—thunderstorm activity—in a humid environment, similar to tropical cyclones elsewhere outside the Mediterranean Sea. In comparison with other tropical cyclone basins, the Mediterranean Sea generally presents a difficult environment for development; although the potential energy necessary for development is not abnormally large, its atmosphere is characterized by its lack of moisture, impeding potential formation. The full development of a medicane often necessitates the formation of a large-scale baroclinic disturbance, transitioning late in its life cycle into a tropical cyclone-like system, nearly always under the influence of a deep, cut-off, cold-core low within the middle-to-upper troposphere, frequently resulting from abnormalities in a wide-spreading Rossby wave—massive meanders of upper-atmospheric winds.

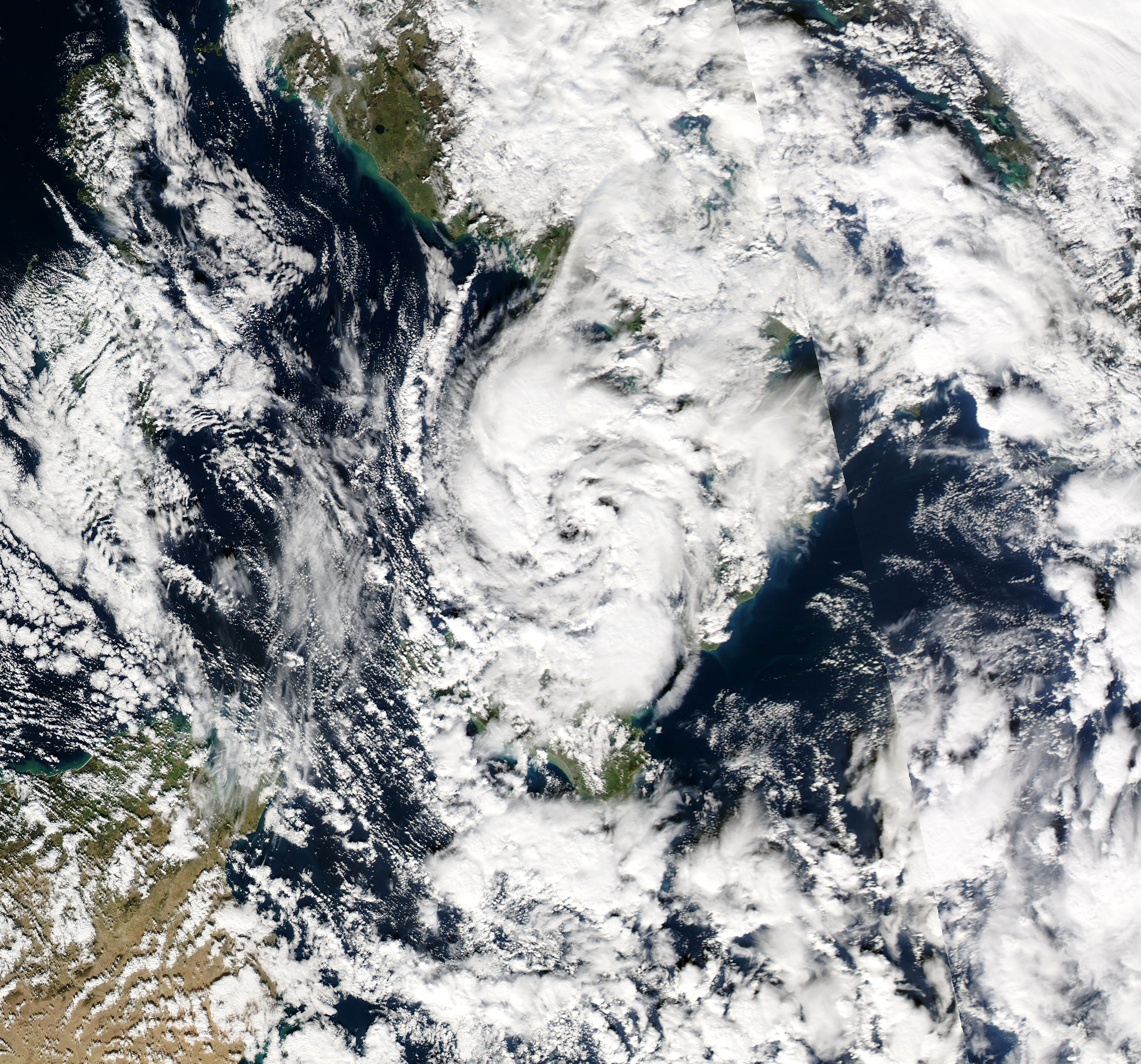
A weak and disorganized Mediterranean tropical-like cyclone on 28 January 2009

The development of medicanes often results from the vertical shift of air in the troposphere as well, resulting in a decrease in its temperature coinciding with an increase in relative humidity, creating an environment more conducive for tropical cyclone formation. This, in turn, leads to in an increase in potential energy, producing heat-induced air-sea instability. Moist air prevents the occurrence of convective downdrafts—the vertically downward movement of air—which often hinder the inception of tropical cyclones, and in such a scenario, wind shear remains minimal; overall, cold-core cut-off lows serve well for the later formation of compact surface flux-influenced warm-core lows such as medicanes. The regular genesis of cold-core upper-level lows and the infrequency of Mediterranean tropical cyclones, however, indicate that additional unusual circumstances are involved the emergence of the latter. Elevated sea surface temperatures, contrasting with cold atmospheric air, encourage atmospheric instability, especially within the troposphere.

In general, most medicanes maintain a radius of 70 to 200 km (40 to 120 mi), last between 12 hours and 5 days, travel between 700 and 3,000 km (430 and 1,860 mi), develop an eye for less than 72 hours, and feature wind speeds of up to 144 km/h (89 mph; 78 kn); in addition, a majority are characterized on satellite imagery as asymmetric systems with a distinct round eye encircled by atmospheric convection. Weak rotation, similar to that in most tropical cyclones, is usually noted in a medicane's early stages, increasing with intensity; medicanes, however, often have less time to intensify, remaining weaker than most North Atlantic hurricanes and only persisting for the duration of a few days. While the entire lifetime of a cyclone may encompass several days, most will only retain tropical characteristics for less than 24 hours. Circumstances sometimes permit the formation of smaller-scale medicanes, although the required conditions differ even from those needed by other medicanes. The development of abnormally small tropical cyclones in the Mediterranean usually requires upper-level atmospheric cyclones inducing cyclogenesis in the lower atmosphere, leading to the formation of warm-core lows, encouraged by favorable moisture, heat, and other environmental circumstances.

Mediterranean cyclones have been compared with polar lows—cyclonic storms which typically develop in the far regions of the Northern and Southern Hemispheres—for their similarly small size and heat-related instability; however, while medicanes nearly always feature warm-core lows, polar lows are primarily cold-core. The prolonged life of medicanes and similarity to polar lows is caused primarily by origins as synoptic-scale surface lows and heat-related instability. Heavy precipitation and convection within a developing Mediterranean tropical cyclone are usually incited by the approach of an upper-level trough—an elongated area of low air pressures—bringing downstream cold air, encircling an existing low-pressure system. After this occurs, however, a considerable reduction in rainfall rates occurs despite further organization, coinciding with a decrease in previously high lightning activity as well. Although troughs will often accompany medicanes along their track, separation eventually occurs, usually in the later part of a Mediterranean tropical cyclone's life cycle. At the same time, moist air, saturated and cooled while rising into the atmosphere, then encounters the medicane, permitting further development and evolution into a tropical cyclone. Many of these characteristics are also evident in polar lows, except for the warm core characteristic.

== Notable medicanes and impacts ==
The deadliest Mediterranean tropical-like cyclone on record was Storm Daniel in September 2023, which resulted in at least 5,951 fatalities with a further 8,000+ people listed as missing, primarily in northeastern Libya. An unnamed medicane in September 1969 resulted in over 600 fatalities due to widespread flooding in Algeria and Tunisia. In Europe, the deadliest medicane on record is Cyclone Numa of 2017, which resulted in 22 fatalities in Greece.

Rarely, Mediterranean tropical-like cyclones can reach hurricane intensity. The strongest medicane on record was Cyclone Ianos in 2020, which reached maximum wind speeds equivalent to a Category 2 hurricane on the Saffir–Simpson scale. In 2014, Cyclone Qëndresa recorded winds equivalent to a Category 1 hurricane at landfall on the eastern coast of Sicily.

== Tropical-like cyclones in the Black Sea ==
The 2005 Black Sea cyclone on 27 September

On a number of occasions, tropical-like storms similar to the tropical-like cyclones observed in the Mediterranean have formed in the Black Sea, including storms on 21 March 2002, 7–11 August 2002, 25–29 September 2005, 6-9 September 2018, and 23 September 2024. The 25–29 September 2005 cyclone is particularly well-documented and investigated, attaining an estimated peak windspeeds of 95 km/h (59 mph; 51 kn) with a minimum central pressure of 992 mbar (29.3 inHg).

== See also ==
- 1996 Lake Huron cyclone
- 2006 Central Pacific cyclone
- European windstorm (fully extratropical)
- South Atlantic tropical cyclone
- Subtropical Cyclone Katie
- Subtropical Cyclone Lexi
- Subtropical Storm 96C
- Tropical cyclogenesis
- Tropical cyclone basins
- Tropical cyclone effects in Europe
- Unusual areas of tropical cyclone formation
