= Polar low =

Small-scale, short-lived depression over certain ocean areas

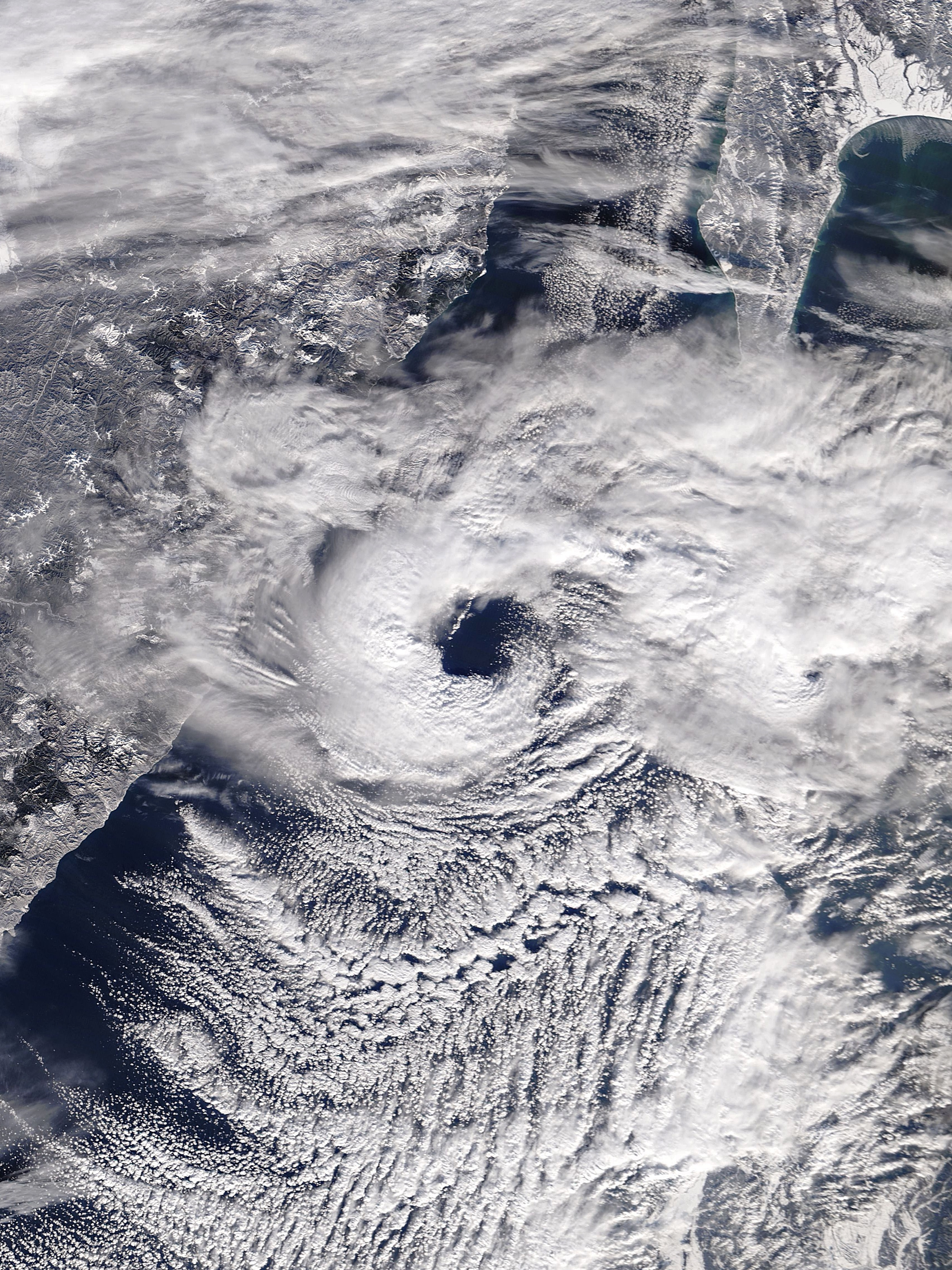
A polar low near the island of Sakhalin, Russia in December 2009

A polar low is a mesoscale, short-lived atmospheric low pressure system (depression) that is found over the ocean areas poleward of the main polar front in both the Northern and Southern Hemispheres, as well as the Sea of Japan. The systems usually have a horizontal length scale of less than 1,000 kilometres (620 mi) and exist for no more than a couple of days. They are part of the larger class of mesoscale weather systems. Polar lows can be difficult to detect using conventional weather reports and are a hazard to high-latitude operations, such as shipping and gas and oil platforms. Polar lows have been referred to by many other terms, such as polar mesoscale vortex, Arctic hurricane, Arctic low, and cold air depression. Today the term is usually reserved for the more vigorous systems that have near-surface winds of at least 17 m/s (38 mph).

== History ==
Polar lows were first identified on the meteorological satellite imagery that became available in the 1960s, which revealed many small-scale cloud vortices at high latitudes. The most active polar lows are found over certain ice-free maritime areas in or near the Arctic during the winter, such as the Norwegian Sea, Barents Sea, Labrador Sea and Gulf of Alaska; however, polar lows also have been found in the Sea of Japan and the Sea of Okhotsk. Polar lows dissipate rapidly when they make landfall. Antarctic systems tend to be weaker than their northern counterparts since the air-sea temperature differences around the continent are generally smaller. Still, vigorous polar lows can be found over the Southern Ocean.

== Structure ==
Evolution of the eye-like feature on a polar low

Polar lows can have a wide range of cloud signatures in satellite imagery, but two broad categories of cloud forms have been identified. The first is the "spiraliform" signature consisting of a number of cloud bands wrapped around the centre of the low. Some polar lows have the appearance in satellite imagery of tropical cyclones, with deep thunderstorm clouds surrounding a cloud-free ‘eye’, which has given rise to the use of the term "Arctic hurricane" to describe some of the more active lows. These systems are more common deep within the polar air. The second is a "comma-shaped" signature that is found more frequently with systems closer to the polar front.

== Formation ==
Polar lows form for a number of different reasons, and a spectrum of systems is observed on satellite imagery. A number of lows develop on horizontal temperature gradients through baroclinic instability, and these can have the appearance of small frontal depressions. At the other extreme are the polar lows with extensive cumulonimbus clouds, which are often associated with cold pools in the mid- to upper-troposphere. During winter, when cold-core lows with temperatures in the mid-levels of the troposphere reaching −45 °C (−49 °F) move over open waters, deep convection forms which allows polar low development to become possible (polar lows usually occur with cold air outbreaks).

== Frequency and impact ==
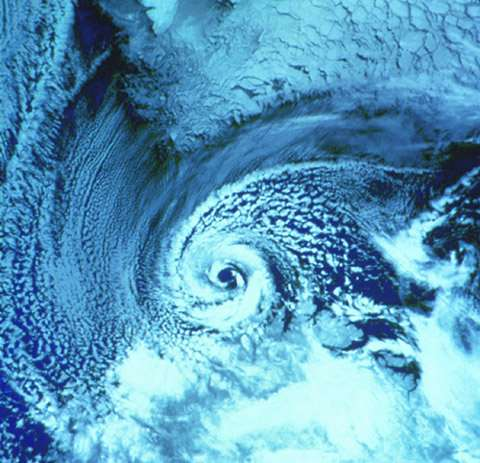
A polar low over the Barents Sea in February 1987

Although cyclonic activity is most prevalent in the Eurasian Arctic with approximately 15 lows per winter, polar lows also occur in Greenland and the Canadian Arctic. Polar lows occur in the extended winter season, with seldom occurrences during the summer. They are not well studied and seldom destructive as they typically take place in sparsely populated areas. The only infrastructure damage that occurs as a direct result of a polar low is to oil and gas rigs present throughout the Antarctic Ocean (sometimes known as the Southern Ocean). Some cargo and shipping vessels are also affected, although there are minimal or no reports of losses in recent years as the result of a polar low.

Despite the more equatorward location, numerous polar lows can form over the Sea of Japan every year, due to the Japan-Sea Polar-Airmass Convergence Zone (JPCZ) contributed by the cold-core low aloft and the warm Tsushima Current. They would bring severe impacts to Japan owing to the proximity to populous regions, with strong winds and heavy snowfall. On December 28, 1986, seven passenger cars of a railway train were blown from the Amarube Viaduct due to a polar low, causing six deaths.

== Forecasting ==
Polar lows are very difficult to forecast and a nowcasting approach is often used, with the systems being advected with the mid-tropospheric flow. Numerical weather prediction models are only just getting the horizontal and vertical resolution to represent these systems.

== See also ==
- Hybrid low (disambiguation)
- Mediterranean tropical-like cyclone
- Subtropical cyclone
