= Tropical Storm Barry (2001) =

Atlantic tropical cyclone

- Tropical Storm Barry approaching the Florida Panhandle on August 5, near peak intensity

Meteorological history
- Formed: August 2, 2001
- Remnant low: August 7, 2001
- Dissipated: August 8, 2001

Tropical storm
- 1-minute sustained (SSHWS/NWS)
- Highest winds: 70 mph (110 km/h)
- Lowest pressure: 990 mbar (hPa); 29.23 inHg

Overall effects
- Fatalities: 2 direct, 7 indirect
- Damage: $30 million (2001 USD)
- Areas affected: Cuba, Southeastern United States (Especially Florida, Alabama)
- IBTrACS
- Part of the 2001 Atlantic hurricane season

Tropical Storm Barry was a strong tropical storm that made landfall on the Florida Panhandle during August 2001. The third tropical cyclone and second named storm of the 2001 Atlantic hurricane season, Barry developed from a tropical wave that moved off the coast of Africa on July 24. The wave entered the Caribbean on July 29 and spawned a low-pressure area, which organized into Tropical Storm Barry on August 3. After fluctuations in intensity and track, the storm attained peak winds of 70 mph (110 km/h) over the Gulf of Mexico. Barry headed northward and moved ashore along the Gulf Coast before degenerating into a remnant low on August 7. On the next day, Barry's remnants dissipated over Missouri.

Unlike the devastating Tropical Storm Allison earlier in the season, Barry's effects were moderate. Nine deaths occurred: six in Cuba and three in Florida. As a tropical cyclone, Barry produced heavy rainfall that peaked at 8.9 in (230 mm) at Tallahassee, in Florida. Gusts in the area reached 79 mph (127 km/h), which was the highest wind speed recorded for the storm. The precursor tropical wave to Barry dropped large amounts of rain on southern Florida, leading to significant flooding and structural damage. Moderate flooding and wind damage occurred throughout the Florida Panhandle. As the storm's remnants tracked inland, parts of the Mississippi Valley received light precipitation. Barry caused an estimated $30 million (2001 USD) in damage.

== Meteorological history ==
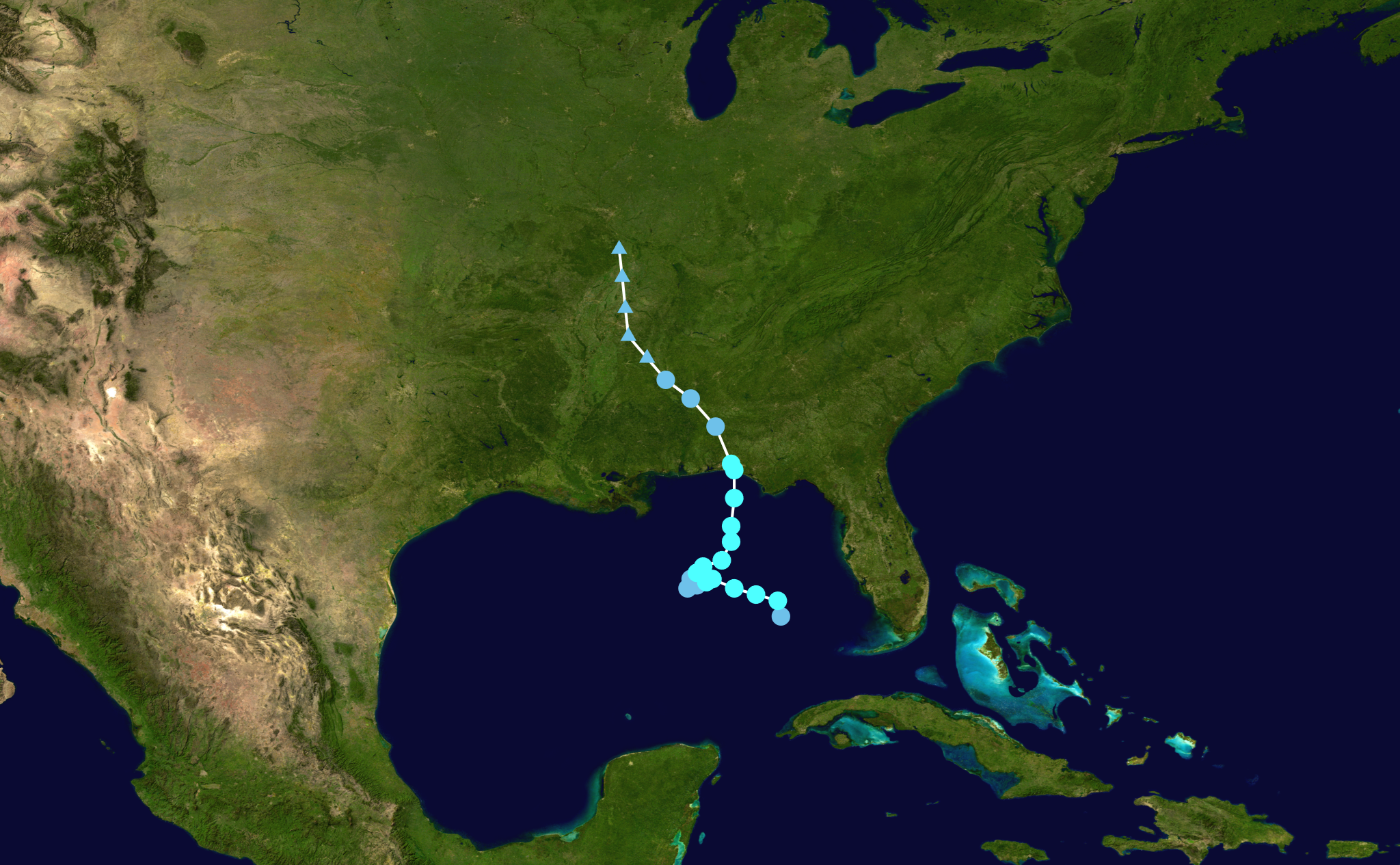
Map plotting the storm's track and intensity, according to the Saffir–Simpson scale Map key Saffir–Simpson scale Tropical depression (≤38 mph, ≤62 km/h) Tropical storm (39–73 mph, 63–118 km/h) Category 1 (74–95 mph, 119–153 km/h) Category 2 (96–110 mph, 154–177 km/h) Category 3 (111–129 mph, 178–208 km/h) Category 4 (130–156 mph, 209–251 km/h) Category 5 (≥157 mph, ≥252 km/h) Unknown Storm type Tropical cyclone Subtropical cyclone Extratropical cyclone, remnant low, tropical disturbance, or monsoon depression

On July 20, 2001, the cyclonic vorticity center of a tropical wave was first noted over Niger near 17°N, 12°E. Four days later, the tropical wave emerged off the west coast of Africa, and tracked westward across the Atlantic Ocean. Little cyclonic development occurred until July 28, when convection began to increase along the wave. The wave moved into the eastern Caribbean Sea on July 29, and its convection continued to increase while it tracked west-northwest over the subsequent few days. The disturbance emerged into the Gulf of Mexico on August 1, with rainfall noted over southern Florida and the western tip of Cuba. That same day, a broad low-pressure system developed along the wave near the Dry Tortugas at the end of the Florida Keys, which began to intensify as it moved northwestward. At around 1800 UTC on August 2, an Air Force Reserve Hurricane Hunter aircraft investigating the system discovered that the low had organized into a tropical storm, which received the name Barry. Post-hurricane season reanalysis, however, revealed that the low had become a tropical depression six hours earlier. There is uncertainty as to whether Barry actually held tropical characteristics at the time of designation, because of an upper-level low that was situated over the cyclone's surface center.

When Barry became a tropical cyclone, its convection wrapped around roughly half of the center. Outflow in the eastern semicircle was good, although due to upper-level wind shear, it was restricted to southeast of the circulation. The cyclone became embedded within a mid- to-upper-level trough between the ridge over the central U.S. and the ridge over the northwestern Caribbean. A strong, upper-level cyclonic shear axis extended from just south of Cape Hatteras to near Brownsville, Texas, which prevented Barry from accelerating in forward speed. The ridge over the United States weakened, thus collapsing the steering pattern; this resulted in a west-southwestward drifting motion of the tropical storm by around August 3. Early on August 3, strong westerly winds prevailed, and separated the center of circulation from what limited convection remained. The storm quickly regained some convection, although maximum sustained winds remained weak, at about 40 mph (60 km/h). Despite a slight drop in barometric pressure, post-season analysis revealed Barry weakened into a tropical depression early on August 4 due to the persistent wind shear and falling external pressure.

At 1800 UTC on August 4, the cyclone re-intensified slightly, and was upgraded to a tropical storm as the shear decreased. Early on August 5, a strengthening period began as deep convection ignited over and near the low-level center. Prior to landfall, banding features developed on the eastern half of the circulation, despite some residual westerly shear. Within seven hours, the barometric pressure dropped from 1004 mb to 990 mb and overall satellite presentation had begun to improve. Barry reached its peak intensity at 1800 UTC on August 5 with winds of 70 mph (110 km/h), just shy of hurricane status. An eye formed at around the same time. At 0500 UTC on August 6, Barry increased in forward speed and made landfall at Santa Rosa Beach, Florida, with winds of 70 mph (110 km/h). The National Hurricane Center (NHC) attempted to determine if Barry intensified into a Category 1 hurricane prior to landfall and noted that "the general public provided important observations of Barry." This included measurements of sustained winds of 69 to 75 mph (111 to 121 km/h) and stronger gusts. However, the NHC could not ascertain the accuracy of these observations. Moving inland, the system weakened rapidly to a tropical depression; the NHC issued its last advisory on the storm early on August 6. By the evening hours, maximum sustained winds near the center were around 5 mph (8.0 km/h) to 10 mph (16 km/h), as the system slowed significantly and drifted northwest at about 7 mph (11 km/h). The depression turned northwestward, and steadily weakened to a remnant low near Memphis, Tennessee. on August 7, and the remnant low dissipated on August 8, over southeastern Missouri.

== Preparations ==
Radar image of the storm making landfall on the Florida Panhandle

In advance of the storm, the National Hurricane Center issued tropical storm watches and warnings for much of the U.S. Gulf Coast. They were upgraded to a hurricane warning when the storm was predicted to reach hurricane intensity. Because that strengthening failed to occur, the hurricane warning was downgraded to a tropical storm warning shortly before landfall. Westward, the warnings for Louisiana and Mississippi were discontinued. After Tropical Storm Barry made landfall, all tropical storm warnings for the Florida Panhandle were discontinued. Flood warnings were issued for parts of Leon and Wakulla counties, while a flash flood watch was in effect for parts of southern Georgia. A tornado watch was issued for the eastern Florida Panhandle, southern Georgia, as well as portions of central and eastern Alabama.

As Barry approached the Florida Panhandle, voluntary evacuations took place in eight counties. Shelters opened in six counties, though most were placed on standby. In parts of Franklin County, mandatory evacuations were ordered, and in Okaloosa County, tolls on the Mid-Bay Bridge were suspended. Forty C-130 cargo aircraft and about 300 personnel from Hurlburt Field were moved to the Little Rock Air Force Base in Arkansas to flee the storm's projected path. In Tallahassee, county officials filled sandbags in areas vulnerable to flooding. At Grand Isle State Park, park rangers moved picnic tables out of tidal range and closed the camping grounds for a period of time. Additionally, the storm forced NASA to delay a shuttle launch in southern Florida. Elsewhere, thousands of personnel were evacuated from several offshore oil platforms. The city of New Orleans closed 60 of its 72 floodgates to avoid possible flooding. Throughout southeastern Louisiana, including New Orleans, roughly 500 Red Cross volunteers and staff members were on standby. The threat of the storm forced the cancellation of two 'N Sync concerts, one at Pro Player Stadium and the other at Legion Field.

== Impact ==
=== Cuba and Florida ===
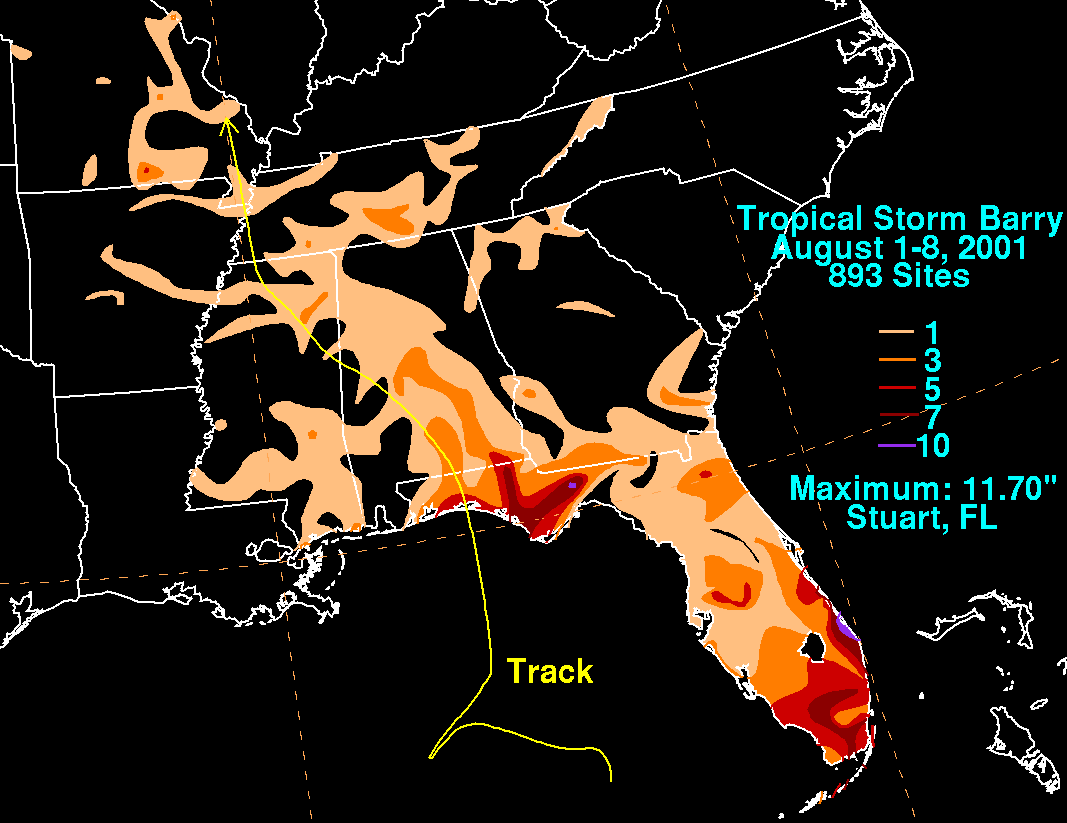
Rainfall totals across the United States

The precursor tropical wave to Barry dropped widespread rainfall in western Cuba, but no damage was reported. Offshore, high seas sank a Cuban refugee boat, drowning 6 of its 28 passengers.

Three people in Florida were killed by the storm, and total damage is estimated at around $30 million (2001 USD). In southern Florida, the precursor to Barry produced 3 in (75 mm) to 8 in (200 mm), with rainfall peaking at 13 in (330 mm). The rain helped relieve persistent drought conditions; however, it caused significant flooding in Martin County on August 2, where a total of 300 homes received water damage. About 63 structures and 6 mobile homes in the county sustained major damage. In the Treasure Coast, catfish reportedly swam through flooded streets. Winds downed a 60 ft (18 m) radio tower, striking a house.

Due to the initial slow movement of the storm, outer rainbands began affecting the Florida Panhandle on August 4, with the heaviest rainfall observed on August 5–6. The storm dropped 5 to 9 in (130 to 230 mm); the highest official report was 8.9 in (230 mm) at Tallahassee, though unofficial reports ranged as high as 11 in (280 mm). The rainfall inundated several structures in Bay County due to roof damage. Flooding occurred in Leon County and parts of Apalachicola National Forest, where torrential rains flowed into the Cascade Lakes, Lake Bradford, and Munson Slough; the Munson Slough rose to its highest level since 1994. Numerous county and secondary roads were closed by floodwater in Walton, Washington, and Bay counties, as well as in the Tallahassee area. In and around Tallahassee, 100 vehicles were stalled by flood waters and towed, while four residents of an apartment complex on Allen Road were forced to evacuate due to rising waters. Sporadic flooding also occurred in Franklin County and Wakulla County. An indirect death occurred from a traffic accident due to heavy rain in Jackson County.

Wind gusts peaked at 79 mph (127 km/h) at the Eglin Air Force Base Range Station C-72. Light to moderate winds were widespread, causing damage throughout Walton, Washington, Bay, Calhoun, Gulf and Okaloosa counties. Trees were downed or damaged, and several structures suffered light wind damage. Window damage was reported at a high-rise condominium building in Destin, while nearby, the Mid-Bay Bridge was closed due to high winds. The Freeport Elementary School in Walton County sustained minor roof damage. Storm surge was generally light, ranging from 1 to 3 ft (0.30 to 0.91 m), with only minor beach erosion as a result. As a tropical system, Barry spawned a few weak tornadoes that caused minor damage. In an outer rain band, a lightning strike in Jacksonville killed one person. Another death is blamed on a rip current off of Sanibel Island. In total, the storm left 34,000 customers in the state without power.

=== Elsewhere ===
Tropical Storm Barry dropped light to moderate rainfall across Alabama, peaking at 4.57 in (116 mm) near the town of Evergreen. About 2 in (50 mm) fell over the state's peanut-growing region, helping to alleviate drought conditions. Heavy showers were also reported in the Birmingham area. Despite moderate rainfall totals inland, coastal locations received very little precipitation. Minor street flooding occurred in Geneva, Enterprise and New Brockton. Wind gusts peaked at 39 mph (63 km/h) at Montgomery, although damage was light, mostly from downed trees. Damage to awnings and small structures was reported in Florala. Barry's remnants produced light rainfall across Mississippi and Georgia, though no damage was reported. As the storm continued to track inland, it dropped up to 3 in (75 mm) of rain throughout Arkansas, Missouri and western Tennessee.

== See also ==
- List of Florida hurricanes
- Other storms of the same name
