= List of storms named Barry =

The name Barry has been used for nine tropical cyclones worldwide: eight in the Atlantic Ocean and one in the Australian region.

In the Atlantic:

- Hurricane Barry (1983), made landfall in Florida as a tropical storm, weakened to a depression before crossing, strengthened into a hurricane after exiting into the Gulf of Mexico; later struck Mexico, causing some damage
- Tropical Storm Barry (1989), dissipated in the mid-Atlantic without threatening land
- Tropical Storm Barry (1995), formed off South Carolina then moved north, making landfall on eastern tip of Nova Scotia, causing no damage
- Tropical Storm Barry (2001), made landfall in Florida, causing two deaths and $30 million in damage
- Tropical Storm Barry (2007), short-lived tropical storm that made landfall in western Florida
- Tropical Storm Barry (2013), made landfall in Belize as a tropical depression before emerging into the Bay of Campeche and then making landfall in eastern Mexico
- Hurricane Barry (2019), formed off the U.S. Gulf Coast before making landfall in Louisiana as a Category 1 hurricane
- Tropical Storm Barry (2025), short-lived tropical storm that formed in the Bay of Campeche and made landfall in Mexico as a tropical depression

In the Australian region:

- Cyclone Barry (1996), Category 4 severe tropical cyclone (Australian scale)
