= Fujiwhara effect =

Meteorological phenomenon involving two cyclones circling each other

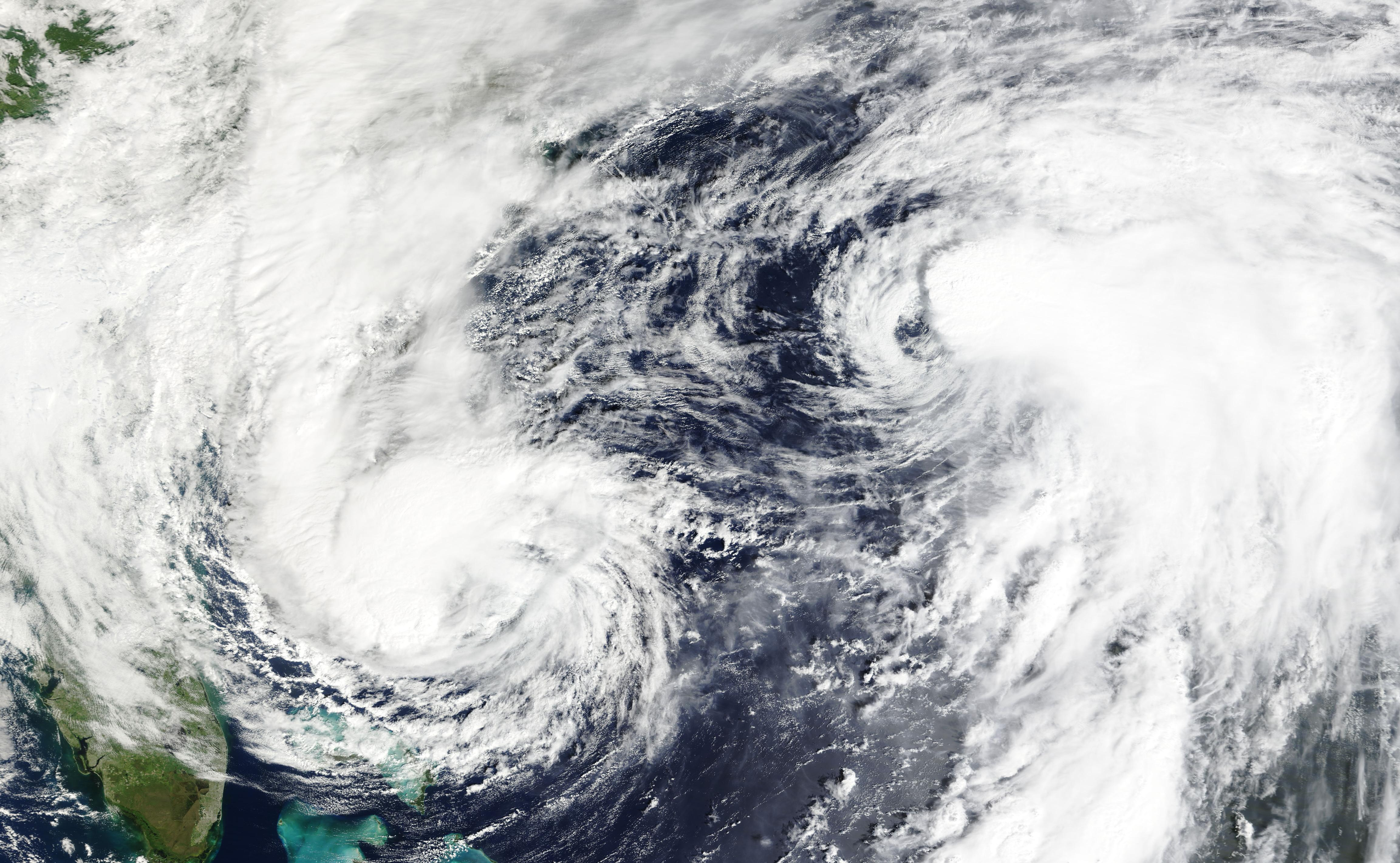
Hurricanes Imelda (left) and Humberto (right) displaying the Fujiwhara effect during the 2025 Atlantic hurricane season.

The Fujiwhara effect, sometimes referred to as the Fujiwhara interaction or binary interaction, is a phenomenon that occurs when two nearby cyclonic vortices move around each other and close the distance between the circulations of their corresponding low-pressure areas. The effect is named after Sakuhei Fujiwhara, the Japanese meteorologist who initially described the effect. Binary interaction of smaller circulations can cause the development of a larger cyclone or cause two cyclones to merge into one. Extratropical cyclones typically engage in binary interaction when within 2,000 kilometres (1,200 mi) of one another, while tropical cyclones typically interact within 1,400 kilometres (870 mi) of each other. Fujiwhara described the effect in a 1921 paper which was based in an 1889 paper by a Japanese researcher and eventually gained popularity in the United States after World War II.

== Description and examples ==
Diagram of the Fujiwhara effect, showing how two tropical cyclones interact with each other.

When cyclones are in proximity of one another, their centers will circle each other cyclonically: counterclockwise in the Northern Hemisphere and clockwise in the Southern Hemisphere, about a point between the two systems due to their cyclonic wind circulations. The two vortices will be attracted to each other and eventually spiral into the center point and merge. It has not been agreed upon whether this is due to the divergent portion of the wind or vorticity advection. If the two vortices are of equal size, they partake in a "dance" where the vortices orbit the center point; they can also deflect each other to the other direction. If the two vortices are of unequal size, the larger vortex will tend to dominate the interaction, and the smaller vortex will circle around it. The effect is named after Sakuhei Fujiwhara, the Japanese meteorologist who initially described it in a 1921 paper. Numerous factors affect the phenomenon, namely the separation distance, the relative size of the vortices, and their intensity. For instance: when two vortices are close, they have a high chance of merging.

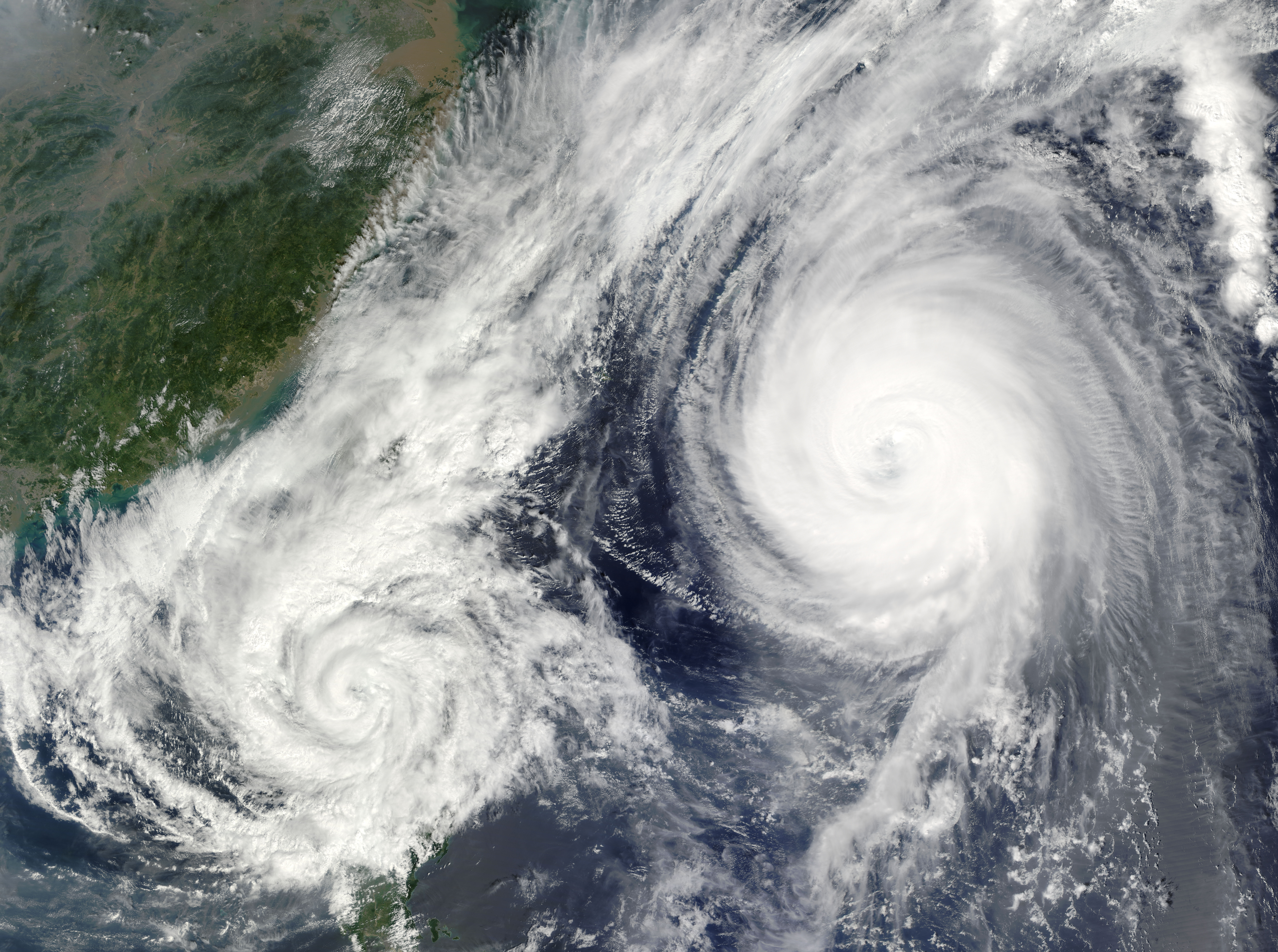
Typhoon Parma (left) and Melor (right) interacting with each other in the Philippine Sea on October 6, 2009.

The phenomenon happened in the East Pacific Ocean in July 2017 when Hurricane Hilary and Hurricane Irwin interacted; Hilary became stronger while Irwin became weaker. The interaction caused Irwin to change course northwest before dissipating. The phenomenon is uncommon in the Atlantic Ocean; a notable instance was in 1995, when Hurricane Iris absorbed Hurricane Humberto and a more recent one happened in 2025 with Hurricane Imelda and Hurricane Humberto. In the West Pacific Ocean, Typhoon Parma and Typhoon Melor engaged in a Fujiwhara dance in 2009; the interaction caused Parma to stall near the Philippines. In the central Indian Ocean, the phenomenon was undergone by Cyclone Diamondra and Cyclone Eunice in 2015, while in the eastern Indian Ocean, Cyclone Seroja and Cyclone Odette experienced the effect in 2021. Extratropical cyclones also undergo the Fujiwhara effect.

== History ==
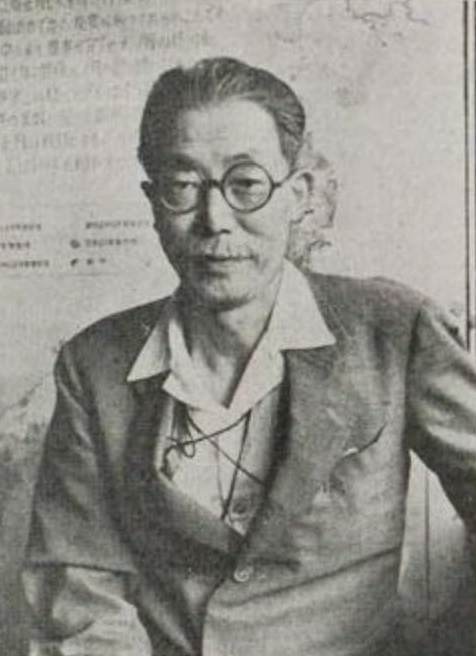
Sakuhei Fujiwhara, the meteorologist who discovered the phenomenon.

Diro Kitao, a Japanese researcher, studied interactions between tropical cyclones in 1889 which served as the basis for the studies of Sakuhei Fujiwhara. The effect was first noticed when Fujiwhara described it in a 1921 paper about the motion of vortices in water titled "The natural tendency towards symmetry of motion and its application as a principle in meteorology". The interaction in the paper was researched through a series of water tank experiments. During the 1920s, Fujiwhara published numerous other papers detailing the effect. The United States Army gained damage multiple times during World War II due to typhoons which led them to establish a center for typhoon tracking in Guam which provided warnings. Douglas MacArthur's invasion of Japan was postponed in 1945 when Typhoon Susan and Typhoon Ruth approached the country while interacting, giving them an opportunity to analyze the interaction of these tropical cyclones.

After this, the phenomenon was popularized in the United States from a research paper in 1951; the first well-known instance of the phenomenon was in 1964 when Typhoon Marie and Typhoon Kathy merged. The effect was examined in the Monthly Weather Review journal in an edition from 1 November 2003, which highlighted factors influencing the phenomenon. According to a report by the National Research Institute for Earth Science and Disaster Resilience (NIED), the definition changed drastically: the original definition was the merging of tropical cyclones while the modern definition is the general interaction between cyclones.

== In cyclones ==
=== Tropical cyclones ===
Odette (left) and Seroja (right) engaged in a Fujiwhara interaction whilst intensifying between 7–9 April 2021.

Tropical cyclones can form when smaller circulations within the Intertropical Convergence Zone merge. The effect is often mentioned in relation to the motion of tropical cyclones, although the final merging of the two storms is uncommon. The effect becomes noticeable when they approach within 1,400 kilometres (870 mi) of each other. Rotation rates within binary pairs accelerate when tropical cyclones close within 650 kilometres (400 mi) of each other. Merger of the two systems (or shearing out of one of the pair) becomes realized when they are within 300 kilometres (190 mi) of one another.

=== Extratropical cyclones ===
This satellite loop covering April 26–28, 2011 shows two extratropical cyclones involved in Fujiwhara interaction across the Midwest and Great Lakes.

Binary interaction is seen between nearby extratropical cyclones when within 2,000 kilometres (1,200 mi) of each other, with significant acceleration occurring when the low-pressure areas are within 1,100 kilometres (680 mi) of one another. Interactions between their circulations at the 500 hPa level (5,500 metres or 18,000 feet above sea level) behave more predictably than their surface circulations. This most often results in a merging of the two low-pressure systems into a single extratropical cyclone, or can less commonly result in a change of direction of one or both of the cyclones. The precise results of such interactions depend on factors such as the size of the two cyclones, their distance from each other, and the prevailing atmospheric conditions around them.

== See also ==
- Satellite tornado
