= Timeline of the 2025 Atlantic hurricane season =

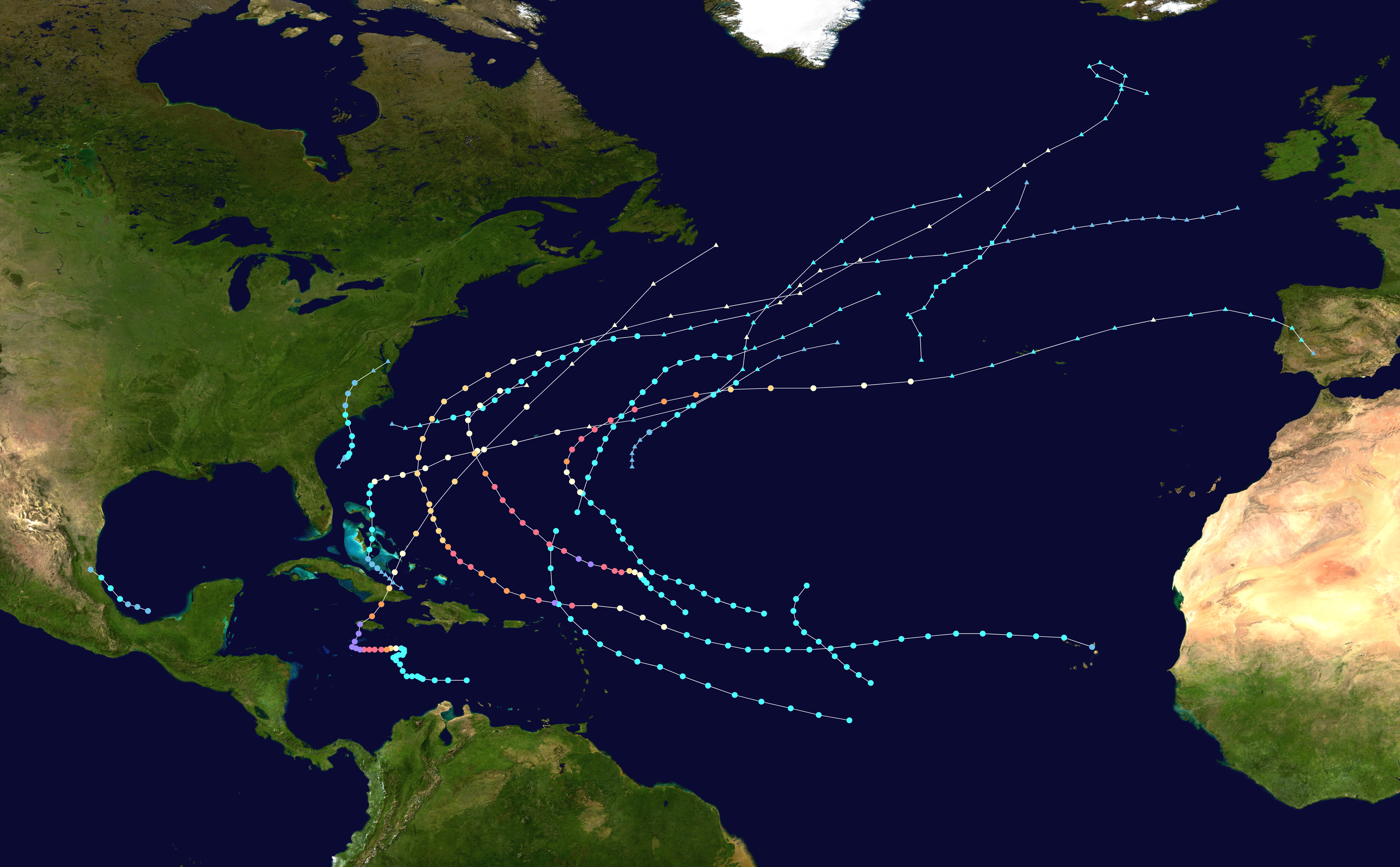
- Season summary map

Season boundaries
- First system formed: June 23, 2025
- Last system dissipated: October 31, 2025

Strongest system
- Name: Melissa
- Maximum winds: 190 mph (305 km/h)
- Lowest pressure: 892 mbar (hPa; 26.34 inHg)

Longest lasting system
- Name: Erin
- Duration: 11.75 days
Storm articles
- Tropical Storm Barry (2025)
- Tropical Storm Chantal (2025)
- Hurricane Erin (2025)
- Hurricane Gabrielle (2025)
- Hurricane Imelda
- Tropical Storm Jerry (2025)
- Hurricane Melissa

The 2025 Atlantic hurricane season was a near-average season in the Atlantic Ocean in the Northern Hemisphere. The season officially began on June 1, and ended on November 30. These dates, adopted by convention, historically describe the period in each year when most subtropical or tropical cyclogenesis occurs in the Atlantic Ocean (over 97%). No subtropical or tropical development occurred in the Atlantic prior to the start of the season, as the first system, Tropical Storm Andrea, did not form until June 23. Overall, 13 named storms formed; 5 of those became hurricanes, of which 4 strengthened into major hurricanes. (Note: Hurricanes reaching Category 3 and higher—1-minute sustained winds higher than 110 miles per hour (178 km/h)—on the Saffir–Simpson scale are described as major hurricanes.) The season featured three Category 5 hurricanes, the highest rank on the Saffir-Simpson scale. Among the three was Hurricane Melissa, the final storm of the season, which dissipated on October 31.

This timeline documents tropical cyclone formations, strengthening, weakening, landfalls, extratropical transitions, and dissipations during the season. It includes information that was not released throughout the season, meaning that data from post-storm reviews by the National Hurricane Center, such as a storm that was not initially warned upon, has been included.

The time stamp for each event is first stated using Coordinated Universal Time (UTC), the 24-hour clock where 00:00 is midnight UTC. The NHC uses both UTC and the time zone where the center of the tropical cyclone is currently located. The time zones utilized (east to west) are: Greenwich, Cape Verde, Atlantic, Eastern, and Central. In this timeline, the respective area time is included in parentheses. Additionally, figures for maximum sustained winds and position estimates are rounded to the nearest 5 units (miles, or kilometers), following National Hurricane Center practice. Direct wind observations are rounded to the nearest whole number. Atmospheric pressures are listed to the nearest millibar and nearest hundredth of an inch of mercury.

== Timeline of events ==
=== June ===
June 1

- The 2025 Atlantic hurricane season officially begins.

June 23

- 06:00 UTC (2:00 a.m. AST) at 32.6°N 56.3°W – A tropical depression forms from a non-tropical low-pressure area about 490 mi (785 km) east of Bermuda.
- 12:00 UTC (8:00 a.m. AST) at 33.2°N 55.2°W – The tropical depression strengthens into Tropical Storm Andrea about 560 mi (900 km) east of Bermuda, and simultaneously reaches its peak intensity, with maximum sustained winds of 40 mph (65 km/h) and a minimum central pressure of 1014 mbar (29.94 inHg).

June 24

- 18:00 UTC (2:00 p.m. AST) at 37.3°N 48.2°W – Tropical Storm Andrea degenerates into a remnant low about 995 mi (1,600 km) east-northeast of Bermuda, and later dissipates.

June 28

- 18:00 UTC (1:00 p.m. CDT) at 19.2°N 93.9°W – Tropical Depression Two forms from the northern portion of a tropical wave about 130 mi (215 km) east of Veracruz, Veracruz.

June 29

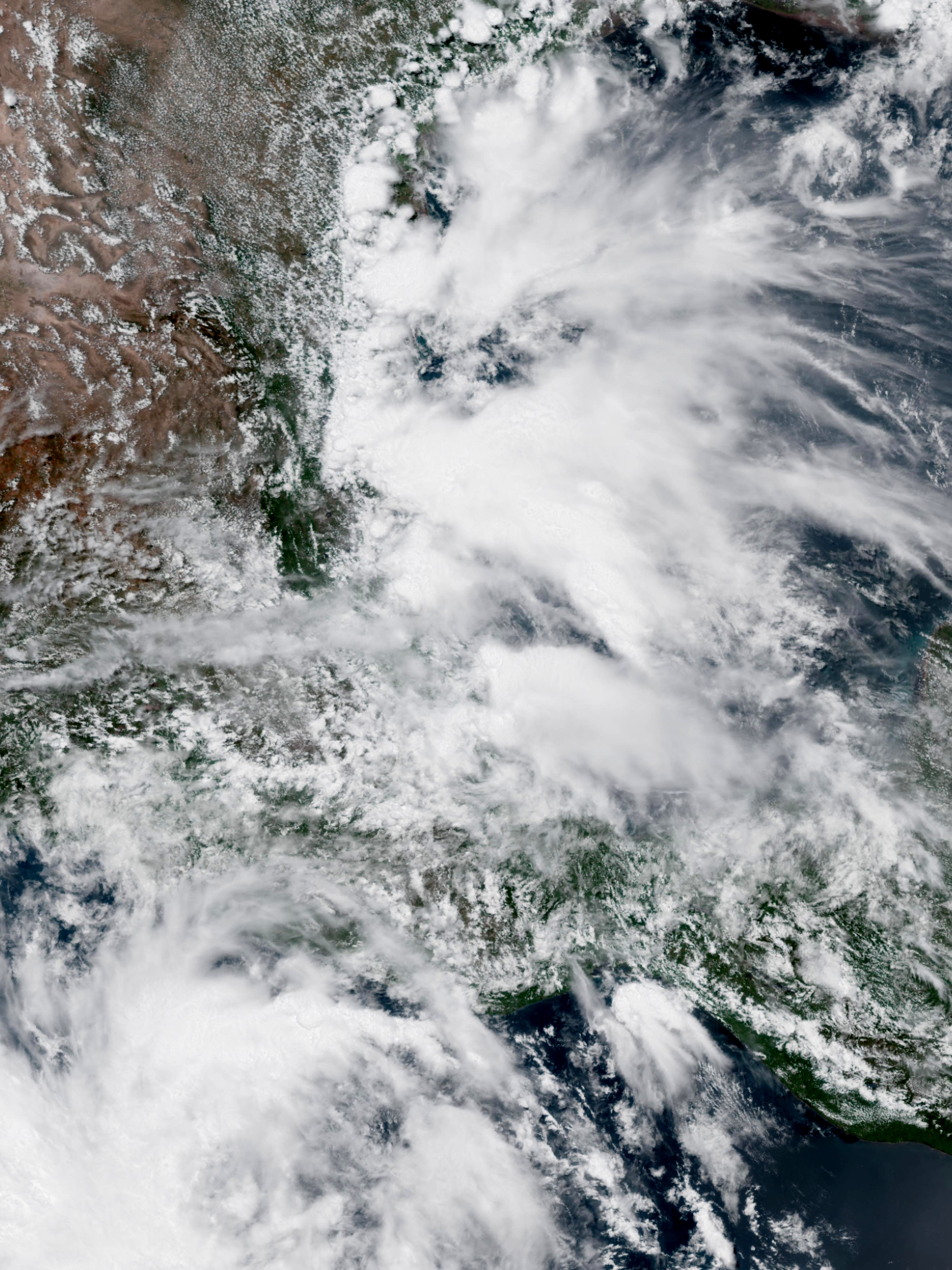
Barry at peak intensity while approaching eastern Mexico on June 29

- 12:00 UTC (7:00 a.m. CDT) at 20.1°N 96.0°W – Tropical Depression Two strengthens into Tropical Storm Barry.
- 18:00 UTC (1:00 p.m. CDT) at 20.9°N 96.7°W – Tropical Storm Barry attains its peak intensity, with maximum sustained winds of 45 mph (75 km/h) and minimum central pressure 1,006 mb (29.71 inHg).

June 30

- 02:00 UTC (9:00 p.m. CDT, June 29) at 21.9°N 97.7°W – Tropical Storm Barry weakens into a tropical depression as it makes landfall in Veracruz, about 25 mi (35 km) south-southeast of Tampico, Tamaulipas, with maximum sustained winds of 35 mph (55 km/h), and later dissipates over the mountainous terrain of eastern Mexico.

=== July ===
July 4

- 18:00 UTC (2:00 p.m. EDT) at 30.7°N 79.1°W – Tropical Depression Three forms from a remnant frontal boundary about 150 mi (240 km) south-southeast of Charleston, South Carolina.

July 5

- 06:00 UTC (2:00 a.m. EDT) at 30.8°N 78.9°W – Tropical Depression Three strengthens into Tropical Storm Chantal about 140 mi (220 km) south-southeast of Charleston.

July 6

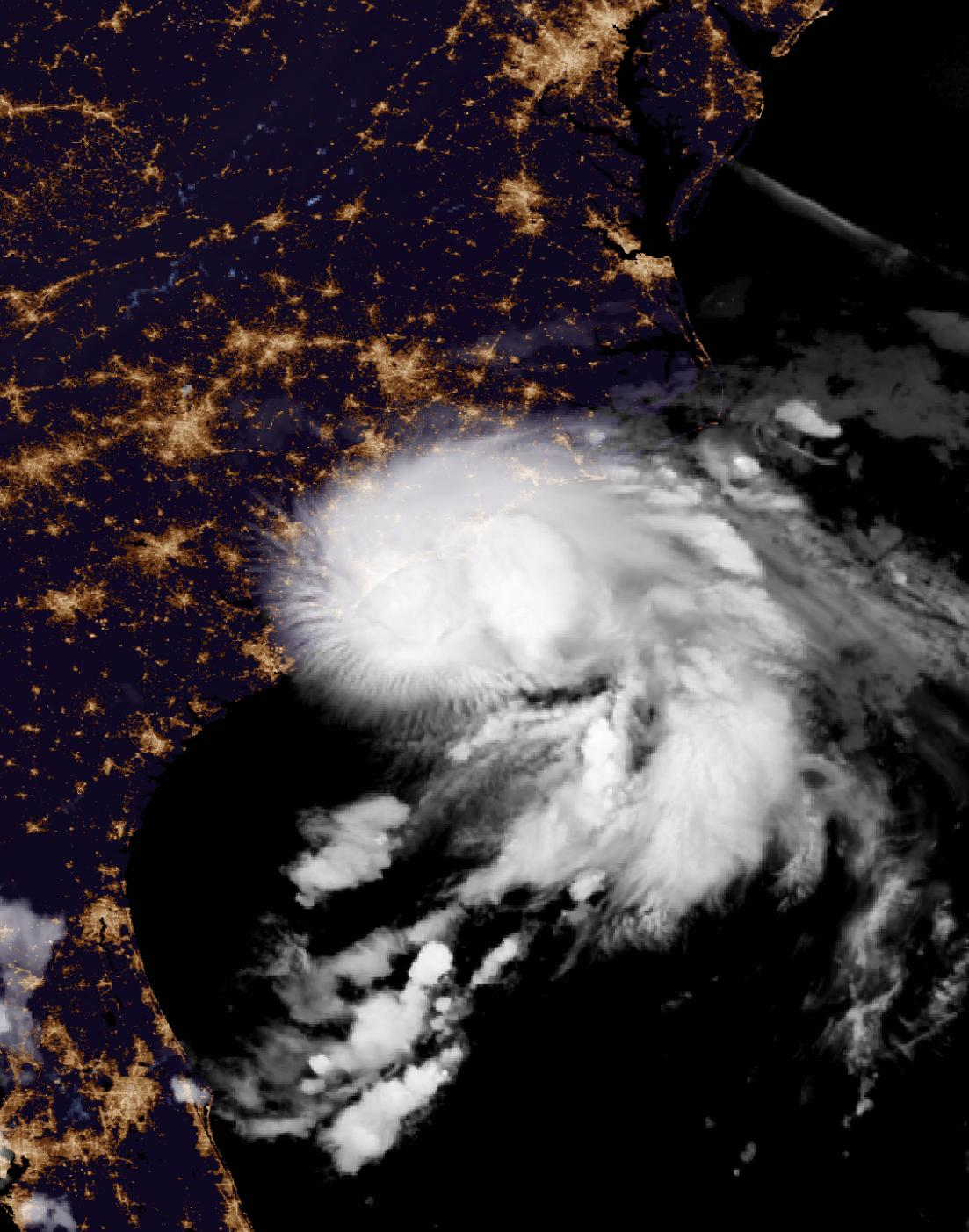
Chantal nearing landfall in South Carolina during the pre-dawn hours on July 6

- 06:00 UTC (2:00 a.m. EDT) at 33.3°N 78.9°W – Tropical Storm Chantal attains its peak intensity with maximum sustained winds of 60 mph (95 km/h) and a minimum central pressure of 1002 mbar (29.59 inHg) about 25 mi (35 km) south of Myrtle Beach, South Carolina.
- 08:00 UTC (4:00 a.m. EDT) at 33.6°N 79.0°W – Tropical Storm Chantal makes landfall at Litchfield Beach, South Carolina, with maximum sustained winds of 50 mph (85 km/h).
- 18:00 UTC (2:00 p.m. EDT) at 34.6°N 79.1°W – Tropical Storm Chantal weakens into a tropical depression inland about 65 mi (100 km) north of Myrtle Beach.

July 7

- 12:00 UTC (8:00 a.m. EDT) at 37.2°N 77.0°W – Tropical Depression Chantal degenerates into a post-tropical remnant low inland over southeastern Virginia, later opening into a trough.

=== August ===
August 3

- 18:00 UTC (2:00 p.m. AST) at 33.7°N 71.0°W – Tropical Storm Dexter forms from a non-tropical low about 375 mi (600 km) west-northwest of Bermuda.

August 6

- 12:00 UTC (8:00 a.m. AST) at 39.6°N 59.0°W – Tropical Storm Dexter attains its peak intensity as a tropical cyclone, with maximum sustained winds of 60 mph (95 km/h) and a minimum central pressure of 999 mb (29.50 inHg).

August 7

- 00:00 UTC (8:00 a.m. AST, August 6) at 39.9°N 55.2°W – Tropical Storm Dexter becomes extratropical, and subsequently dissipates, after briefly strengthening into a hurricane-force extratropical cyclone southeast of St. John's, Newfoundland and Labrador on the morning of August 8.

August 11

- 00:00 UTC (11:00 p.m. CVT, August 10) at 16.5°N 23.1°W – A tropical depression forms from a tropical wave just southwest of Sal, Cape Verde.
- 06:00 UTC (5:00 a.m. CVT) at 17.2°N 25.2°W – Tropical Storm Erin forms and simultandeously makes landfall in Santo Antão, Cape Verde with sustained winds of 40 mph (65 km/h).

August 15

- 12:00 UTC (9:00 a.m. AST) at 18.0°N 55.2°W – Tropical Storm Erin strengthens into a Category 1 hurricane about 430 mi (695 km) east of the northernmost Leeward Islands.

August 16

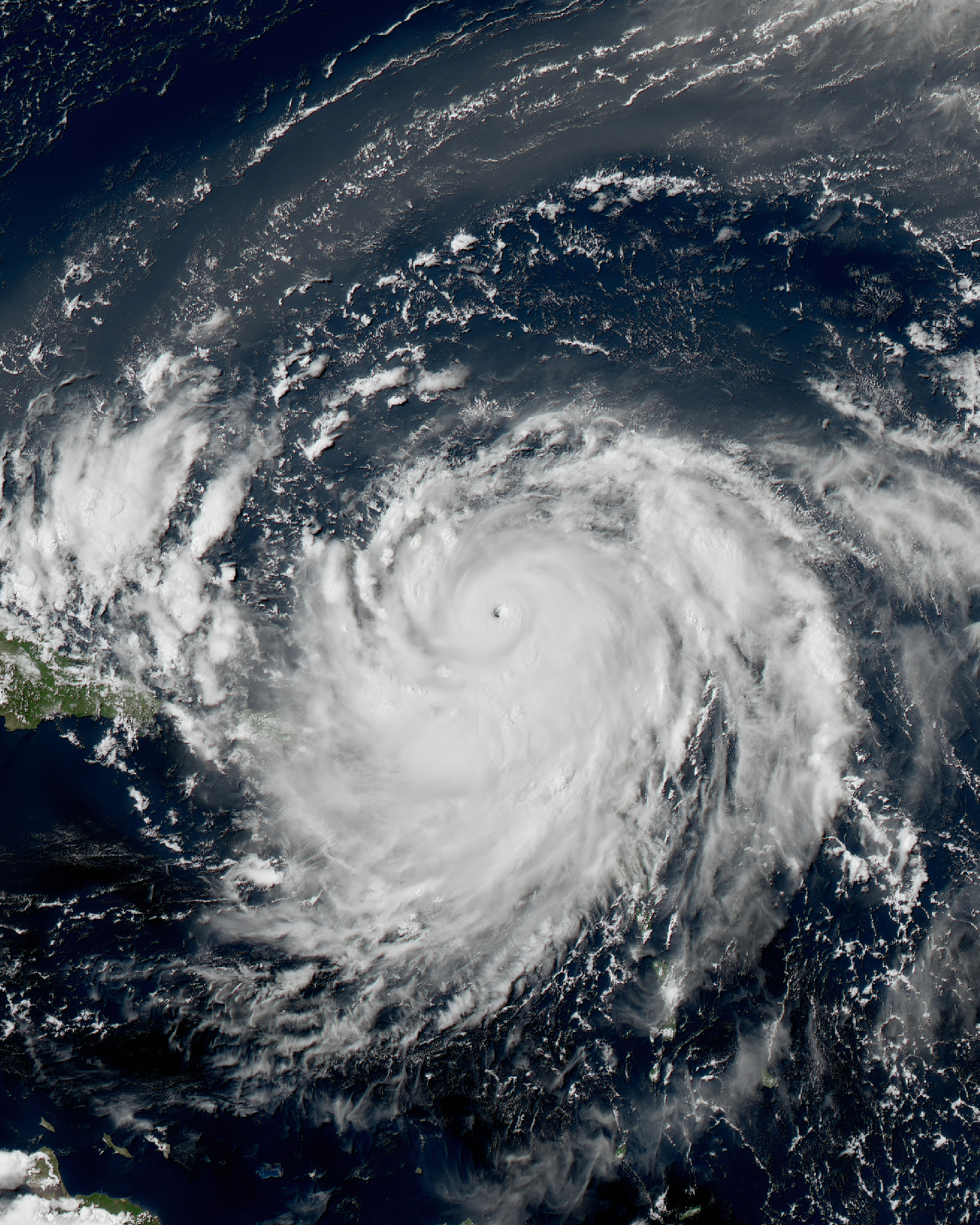
Erin at peak intensity northeast of Anegada, British Virgin Islands on August 16

- 06:00 UTC (2:00 a.m. AST) at 19.6°N 60.4°W – Hurricane Erin strengthens to Category 2 intensity about 260 mi (415 km) east of Anegada, British Virgin Islands.
- 12:00 UTC (8:00 a.m. AST) at 19.6°N 62.1°W – Hurricane Erin strengthens to Category 4 intensity about 155 mi (250 km) east of Anegada.
- 18:00 UTC (2:00 p.m. AST) at 19.8°N 63.4°W – Hurricane Erin strengthens into a Category 5 hurricane and simultaneously attains its peak intensity, with maximum sustained winds of 160 mph (260 km/h) and a minimum central pressure of 913 mbar (26.96 inHg), about 90 mi (150 km) northeast of Anegada.

August 17

- 00:00 UTC (8:00 p.m. AST, August 16) at 20.0°N 64.6°W – Hurricane Erin weakens to Category 4 intensity about 90 mi (150 km) north of Anegada.
- 06:00 UTC (2:00 a.m. AST) at 20.3°N 65.8°W – Hurricane Erin weakens to Category 3 intensity about 145 mi (230 km) northwest of Anegada.

August 18

- 06:00 UTC (2:00 a.m. AST) at 22.5°N 69.7°W – Hurricane Erin re-strengthens to Category 4 intensity about 115 mi (185 km) northeast of Grand Turk Island.
- 12:00 UTC (8:00 a.m. AST) at 22.9°N 70.5°W – Hurricane Erin attains its secondary peak with sustained winds of 140 mph (220 km/h) about 105 mi (165 km) north-northeast of Grand Turk.

August 19

- 06:00 UTC (2:00 a.m. EDT) at 24.5°N 71.8°W – Hurricane Erin weakens to Category 2 intensity about 215 mi (345 km) north of Grand Turk.

August 20

- 12:00 UTC (8:00 a.m. AST) at 29.5°N 73.7°W – Hurricane Erin attains its tertiary peak with sustained winds of 110 mph (175 km/h) (after diminishing to 100 mph (155 km/h) the previous day), about midway between Florida and Bermuda.

August 22

- 06:00 UTC (2:00 a.m. AST) at 37.9°N 66.5°W – Hurricane Erin weakens to Category 1 intensity about 390 mi (630 km) north-northeast of Bermuda.
- 18:00 UTC (2:00 p.m. AST) at 39.4°N 61.4°W – Hurricane Erin transitions into an extratropical cyclone about 520 mi (835 km) north-northeast of Bermuda, and subsequently merges with another extratropical low.

August 23

- 18:00 UTC (2:00 p.m. AST) at 26.6°N 61.7°W – Tropical Storm Fernand forms from the northern portion of a tropical wave about 535 mi (860 km) south-southeast of Bermuda.

August 25

- 12:00 UTC (8:00 a.m. AST) at 33.8°N 58.4°W – Tropical Storm Fernand attains its peak intensity, with maximum sustained winds of 60 mph (95 km/h) and a minimum central pressure of 999 mb (29.50 inHg).

August 27

- 18:00 UTC (2:00 p.m. AST) at 38.9°N 48.4°W – Tropical Storm Fernand transitions into a post-tropical cyclone, and subsequently dissipates.

=== September ===
September 17

- 18:00 UTC (11:00 a.m. AST) at 19.0°N 47.7°W – Tropical Storm Gabrielle froms from a tropical wave about 920 mi (1,480 km) east of the northern Leeward Islands.

September 21

- 18:00 UTC (2:00 p.m. AST) at 28.1°N 61.5°W – Tropical Storm Gabrielle strengthens into a Category 1 hurricane about 350 mi (565 km) southeast of Bermuda.

September 22

Gabrielle strengthening into a Category 3 hurricane on September 22

- 12:00 UTC (8:00 a.m. AST) at 30.4°N 62.5°W – Gabrielle intensifies into a Category 3 hurricane about 190 mi (305 km) southeast of Bermuda.
- 18:00 UTC (2:00 p.m. AST) at 31.3°N 62.1°W – Gabrielle intensifies into a Category 4 hurricane about 175 mi (280 km) southeast of Bermuda.

September 23

- 00:00 UTC (8:00 p.m. AST, September 22) at 32.1°N 61.4°W – Hurricane Gabrielle attains its peak intensity, with maximum sustained winds of 140 mph (220 km/h) and a minimum central pressure of 944 mbar (27.88 inHg), about 195 mi (315 km) east of Bermuda.

September 24

- 00:00 UTC (8:00 p.m. AST, September 23) at 34.9°N 55.2°W – Hurricane Gabrielle weakens into a Category 3 hurricane about 580 mi (930 km) east-northeast of Bermuda.
- 12:00 UTC (8:00 a.m. AST) at 35.8°N 50.2°W – Hurricane Gabrielle weakens into a Category 2 hurricane about 1,285 mi (2,070 km) west of the Azores.
- 12:00 UTC (8:00 a.m. AST) at 19.1°N 53.6°W – Tropical Storm Humberto forms from a tropical wave about 605 mi (970 km) east-northeast of the northern Leeward Islands.

September 25

- 00:00 UTC (8:00 p.m. AST, September 24) at 35.9°N 44.0°W – Hurricane Gabrielle weakens into a Category 1 hurricane west of the Azores.
- 18:00 UTC (6:00 p.m. GMT) at 36.8°N 33.6°W – Hurricane Gabrielle transitions into an extratropical cyclone west-southwest of the Azores, and subsequently dissipates near southern Spain.

September 26

A multi-day satellite loop of hurricanes Humberto (right) and Imelda (center) coming close to each other

- 06:00 UTC (2:00 a.m. AST) at 21.9°N 57.0°W – Tropical Storm Humberto strengthens into a Category 1 hurricane northeast of the northern Leeward Islands.
- 18:00 UTC (2:00 p.m. AST) at 22.2°N 57.8°W – Hurricane Humberto intensifies into a Category 2 hurricane northeast of the northern Leeward Islands.

September 27

- 00:00 UTC (8:00 p.m. AST, September 26) at 22.1°N 58.4°W – Hurricane Humberto intensifies into a Category 4 hurricane northeast of the northern Leeward Islands.
- 18:00 UTC (2:00 p.m. AST) at 22.7°N 60.7°W – Hurricane Humberto intensifies into a Category 5 hurricane about 345 mi (555 km) north-northeast of the northern Leeward Islands.

September 28

- 00:00 UTC (8:00 p.m. AST, September 27) at 23.1°N 61.6°W – Hurricane Humberto attains its peak intensity, with maximum sustained winds of 160 mph (260 km/h) and minimum central pressure of 918 mb (27.11 inHg) north-northeast of the northern Leeward Islands.
- 00:00 UTC (8:00 p.m. EDT, September 27) at 22.4°N 76.7°W – Tropical Depression Nine forms from a tropical wave about 275 mi (445 km) south of Great Abaco Island in the northwestern Bahamas. (Note: Due to the threat the developing system posed to the Bahamas, the National Hurricane Center initiated advisories on it, designating it Potential Tropical Cyclone Nine at 21:00 UTC (5:00 p.m. EDT) on September 26.)
- 06:00 UTC (2:00 a.m. AST) at 23.7°N 67.7°W – Hurricane Humberto weakens into a Category 4 hurricane south of Bermuda.
- 18:00 UTC (2:00 p.m. EDT) at 23.8°N 77.3°W – Tropical Depression Nine strengthens into Tropical Storm Imelda 180 mi (285 km) south of Great Abaco.

September 29

- 12:00 UTC (8:00 a.m. EDT) at 26.4°N 77.1°W – Tropical Storm Imelda makes landfall on Great Abaco, with sustained winds of 50 mph (85 km/h).

September 30

- 00:00 UTC (8:00 p.m. AST, September 29) at 29.5°N 68.6°W – Hurricane Humberto weakens into a Category 3 hurricane southwest of Bermuda.
- 06:00 UTC (2:00 a.m. AST) at 31.0°N 69.4°W – Hurricane Humberto weakens into a Category 2 hurricane west of Bermuda.
- 12:00 UTC (8:00 a.m. AST) at 32.5°N 69.8°W – Hurricane Humberto weakens into a Category 1 hurricane west of Bermuda.
- 12:00 UTC (8:00 a.m. EDT) at 28.9°N 76.9°W – Tropical Storm Imelda strengthens into a Category 1 hurricane about 175 mi (280 km) north of Great Abaco.

=== October ===
October 1

- 12:00 UTC (8:00 a.m. AST) at 36.1°N 65.5°W – Hurricane Humberto transitions into an extratropical cyclone about 265 mi (425 km) north of Bermuda, and later dissipates within a frontal boundary.
- 18:00 UTC (2:00 p.m. EDT) at 31.2°N 69.2°W – Hurricane Imelda attains its peak intensity, with maximum sustained winds of 90 mph (150 km/h) and minimum central pressure of 966 mb (28.53 inHg) about 410 mi (655 km) west-southwest of Bermuda.

October 2

- 12:00 UTC (8:00 a.m. AST) at 33.0°N 60.8°W – Hurricane Imelda transitions into an extratropical cyclone about 230 mi (370 km) east-northeast of Bermuda.

October 7

- 06:00 UTC (2:00 a.m. AST) at 11.0°N 41.3°W – Tropical Storm Jerry forms from a tropical wave about 1,265 mi (2,035 km) east of the Windward Islands.

October 8

- 18:00 UTC (2:00 p.m. AST) at 14.3°N 53.8°W – Tropical Storm Jerry attains its peak intensity, with maximum sustained winds of 65 mph (100 km/h) and minimum central pressure of 1000 mb (29.53 inHg), about 635 mi (1,020 km) east-southeast of the Leeward Islands.

October 9

- 12:00 UTC (12:00 p.m. GMT) at 43.5°N 34.8°W – Subtropical Storm Karen forms from a frontal low pressure system about 345 mi (555 km) northwest of the northern-most Azores Islands, and simultaneously attains its peak intensity with maximum sustained winds of 45 mph (75 km/h) and minimum central pressure of 998 mb (29.47 inHg).

October 11

- 00:00 UTC (12:00 a.m. GMT) at 48.0°N 29.7°W – Subtropical Storm Karen degenerates into a remnant low north-northwest of the northern-most Azores Islands, and later dissipates.
- 12:00 UTC (8:00 a.m. AST) at 25.2°N 63.3°W – Tropical Storm Jerry opens up into a trough north-northeast of Puerto Rico, and subsequently merges with a frontal system.

October 13

- 06:00 UTC (2:00 a.m. AST) at 13.8°N 39.7°W – Tropical Storm Lorenzo forms from a tropical wave about 1,035 mi (1,665 km) west of Cape Verde.

October 14

- 00:00 UTC (8:00 p.m. AST, October 13) at 15.8°N 42.4°W – Tropical Storm Lorenzo attains its peak intensity, with maximum sustained winds 60 mph (95 km/h) and minimum central pressure 1000 mb (29.53 inHg).

October 15

- 12:00 UTC (8:00 a.m. AST) at 21.1°N 44.5°W – Tropical Storm Lorenzo dissipates.

October 21

- 06:00 UTC (2:00 a.m. AST) at 14.0°N 70.0°W – Tropical Storm Melissa forms from a tropical wave about 315 mi (510 km) south of Port-au-Prince, Haiti.

October 25

- 18:00 UTC (2:00 p.m. EDT) at 16.4°N 75.3°W – Tropical Storm Melissa strengthens into a Category 1 hurricane about 175 mi (280 km) south of Jamaica.

October 26

- 00:00 UTC (8:00 p.m. EDT, October 25) at 16.4°N 75.7°W – Hurricane Melissa intensifies into a Category 2 hurricane about 125 mi (205 km) southeast of Kingston, Jamaica.
- 06:00 UTC (2:00 a.m. EDT) at 16.3°N 76.0°W – Hurricane Melissa intensifies into a Category 3 hurricane about 120 mi (195 km) southeast of Kingston.
- 12:00 UTC (8:00 a.m. EDT) at 16.3°N 76.4°W – Hurricane Melissa intensifies into a Category 4 hurricane about 115 mi (185 km) south of Kingston.

October 27

- 12:00 UTC (8:00 a.m. EDT) at 16.3°N 78.0°W – Hurricane Melissa intensifies into a Category 5 hurricane about 140 mi (220 km) southwest of Kingston.

October 28

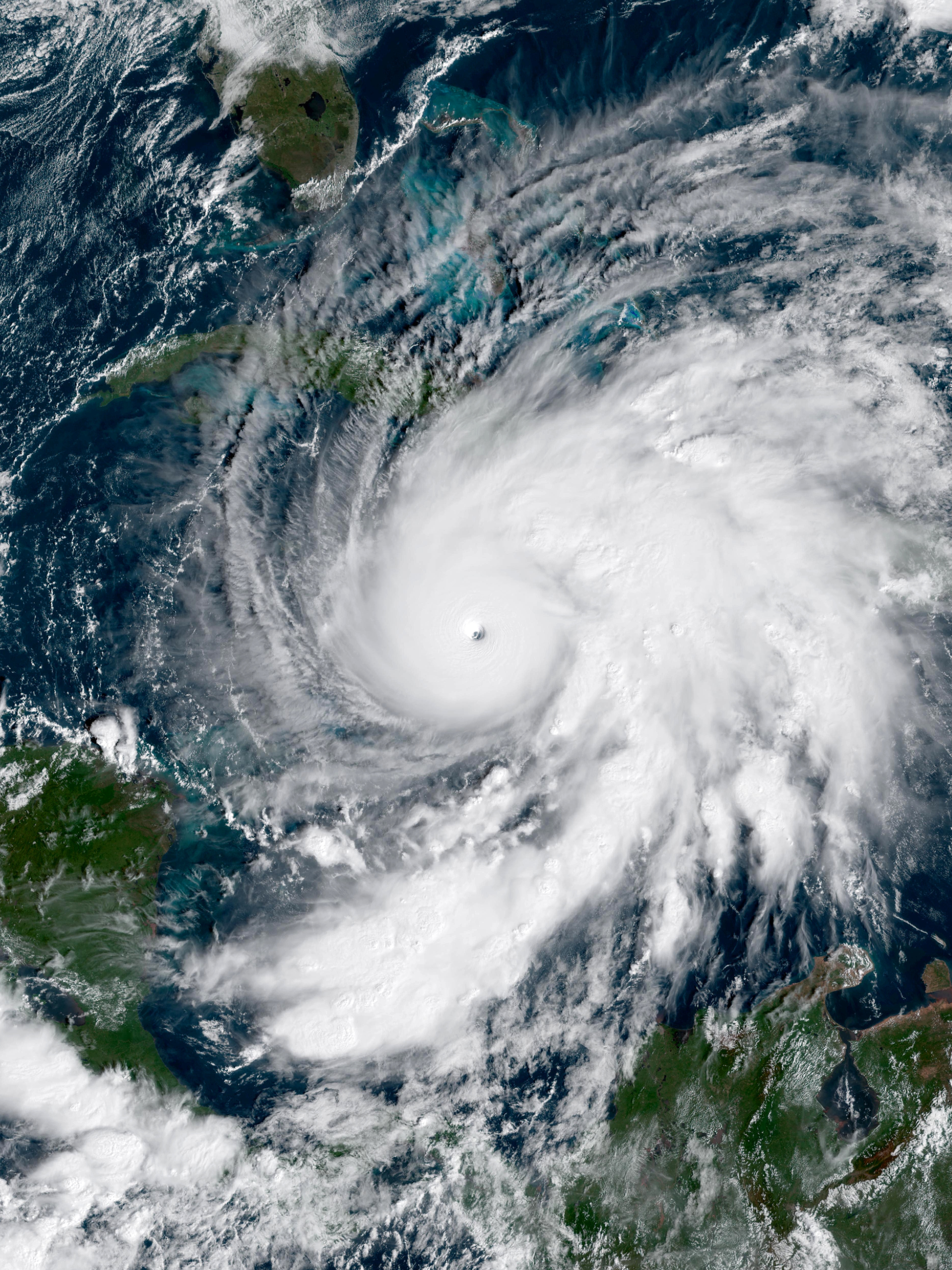
Melissa at peak intensity shortly before landfall in Jamaica on October 28

- 12:00 UTC (8:00 a.m. EDT) at 17.5°N 78.1°E – Hurricane Melissa attains its peak intensity, with maximum sustained winds of 190 mph (305 km/h) and minimum central pressure of 892 mb (26.34 inHg) about 45 mi (75 km) south-southwest of New Hope, Jamaica.
- 17:25 UTC (1:25 p.m. EDT) at 18.1°N 78.0°W – Hurricane Melissa makes landfall with sustained winds of 185 mph (295 km/h) near New Hope.
- 18:00 UTC (2:00 p.m. EDT) at 18.2°N 78.0°W – Hurricane Melissa weakens into a Category 4 hurricane inland over western Jamaica.

October 29

- 00:00 UTC (8:00 p.m. EDT, October 28) at 18.8°N 77.1°W – Hurricane Melissa weakens into a Category 3 hurricane off the northern coast of Jamaica.
- 07:20 UTC (3:20 a.m. EDT) at 20.0°N 76.2°W – Hurricane Melissa makes landfall with sustained winds of 115 mph (185 km/h) near Chivirico, Cuba.
- 12:00 UTC (8:00 a.m. EDT) at 20.9°N 75.8°W – Hurricane Melissa weakens into a Category 2 hurricane inland over eastern Cuba.
- 18:00 UTC (2:00 p.m. EDT) at 22.1°N 75.4°W – Hurricane Melissa weakens into a Category 1 hurricane about 105 mi (165 km) south of Long Island, Bahamas.
- 22.15 UTC (6:15 p.m. EDT) at 23.1°N 75.0°W – Hurricane Melissa makes landfall with sustained winds of 90 mph (150 km/h) on Long Island.

October 30

- 02:00 UTC (10:00 p.m. EDT, October 29) at 24.0°N 74.5°W – Hurricane Melissa makes landfall with sustained winds of 90 mph (150 km/h) on San Salvador Island, Bahamas.
- 06:00 UTC (2:00 a.m. EDT) at 25.0°N 73.8°W – Hurricane Melissa re-intensifies into a Category 2 hurricane about 80 mi (130 km) northeast of San Salvador Island.
- 12:00 UTC (8:00 a.m. EDT) at 26.7°N 72.7°E – Hurricane Melissa attains its secondary peak intensity, with maximum sustained winds of 105 mph (165 km/h) and minimum central pressure of 965 mb (28.50 inHg) about 300 mi (480 km) north of the southeastern Bahamas.

October 31

- 00:00 UTC (8:00 p.m. EDT, October 30) at 31.3°N 68.7°W – Hurricane Melissa weakens into a Category 1 hurricane about 245 mi (400 km) west-southwest of Bermuda.
- 12:00 UTC (8:00 a.m. AST) at 37.7°N 62.1°W – Hurricane Melissa transitions into an extratropical about 405 mi (650 km) north-northeast of Bermuda, then opened up into a trough the following morning southeast of Newfoundland.

=== November ===
- No tropical cyclones form in the Atlantic basin during the month of November.

November 30

- The 2025 Atlantic hurricane season officially ends.

== See also ==
- Timeline of the 2025 Pacific hurricane season
- Tropical cyclones in 2025
- Lists of Atlantic hurricanes
