= Hurricane Imelda =

Category 1 Atlantic hurricane in 2025

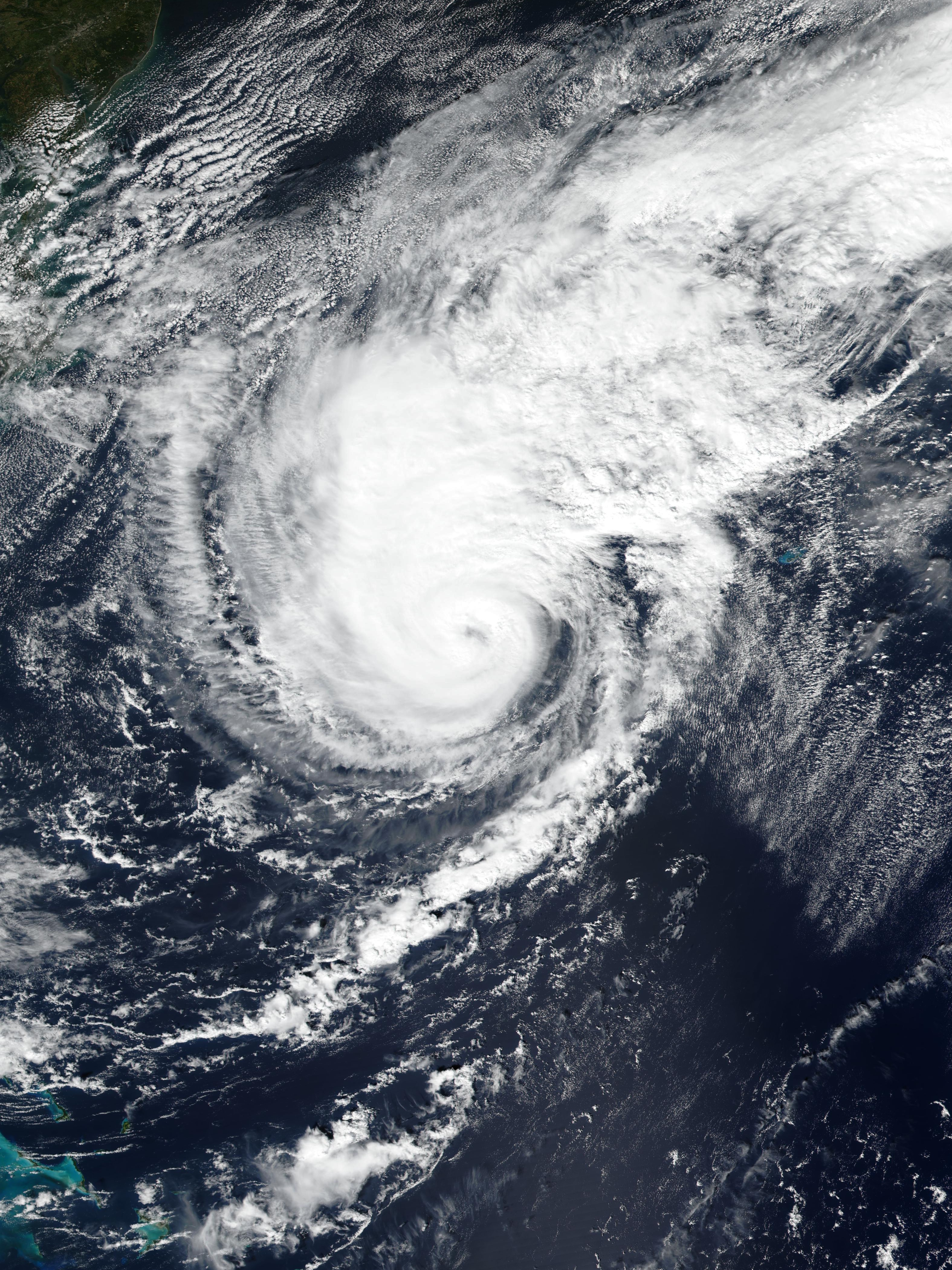
- Imelda at peak intensity west of Bermuda on October 1

Meteorological history
- Formed: September 28, 2025
- Extratropical: October 2, 2025
- Dissipated: October 6, 2025

Category 1 hurricane
- 1-minute sustained (SSHWS/NWS)
- Highest winds: 90 mph (150 km/h)
- Lowest pressure: 966 mbar (hPa); 28.53 inHg

Overall effects
- Fatalities: 3
- Injuries: 2
- Missing: 1
- Damage: >$10 million (2025 USD)
- Areas affected: Leeward Islands; Greater Antilles; Lucayan Archipelago; East Coast of the United States; Bermuda
- IBTrACS
- Part of the 2025 Atlantic hurricane season

Hurricane Imelda (/iːˈmɛldɑː/ ee-MEL-dah) was a moderately strong tropical cyclone that caused significant impacts in the Greater Antilles before affecting the Bahamas and Bermuda from late September to early October 2025. The ninth named storm and fourth hurricane of the 2025 Atlantic hurricane season, the system was the only one of the season's five hurricanes to not become a major hurricane. It formed between Cuba and the Lucayan Archipelago on September 27, although the National Hurricane Center began issuing advisories on the weather disturbance a day prior, when it was still considered to be a potential tropical cyclone. Imelda would progress north, strengthening as it traversed the Bahamas, before becoming a hurricane, and making a sharp eastward turn driven by a combination of atmospheric steering currents and interaction with Hurricane Humberto. Later Imelda hit Bermuda with hurricane-force winds, heavy rain, and rough surf.

Prior to development, Imelda had already caused significant rainfall across the Antilles, particularly in Puerto Rico, Cuba, and the Dominican Republic, where floodwaters killed four men. Damages, estimated by Aon, totaled to more than US$10 million.

== Meteorological history ==
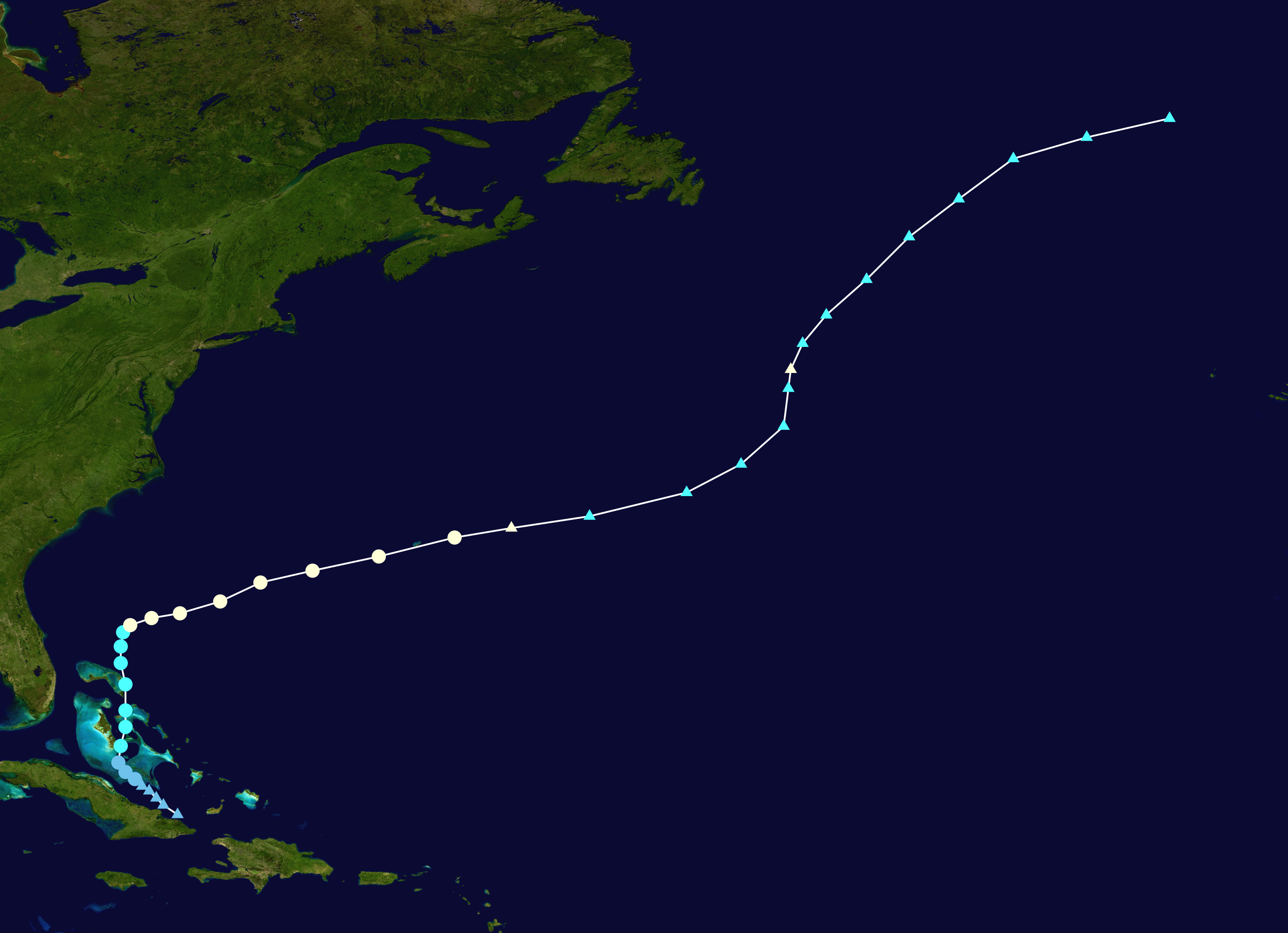
Map plotting the storm's track and intensity, according to the Saffir–Simpson scale Map key Saffir–Simpson scale Tropical depression (≤38 mph, ≤62 km/h) Tropical storm (39–73 mph, 63–118 km/h) Category 1 (74–95 mph, 119–153 km/h) Category 2 (96–110 mph, 154–177 km/h) Category 3 (111–129 mph, 178–208 km/h) Category 4 (130–156 mph, 209–251 km/h) Category 5 (≥157 mph, ≥252 km/h) Unknown Storm type Tropical cyclone Subtropical cyclone Extratropical cyclone, remnant low, tropical disturbance, or monsoon depression

On September 16, a tropical wave moved off the west coast of Africa. It produced limited disorganized showers and thunderstorms as it moved westward across eastern and central tropical Atlantic over the next few days. As the wave approached the Leeward Islands on September 21, this disorganized activity increased. Moving west-northwestward, wave crossed the Leeward Islands on September 23, and then Puerto Rico and the Virgin Islands the following day, bringing gusty winds and heavy rainfall to the region. On September 25, the disturbance began showing signs of organization near Hispaniola. Due to the threat the developing system posed to populated land areas in the region, the National Hurricane Center (NHC) initiated advisories on it, designating it Potential Tropical Cyclone Nine at 21:00 UTC on September 26. The potential tropical cyclone moved slowly northwestward, north of eastern Cuba, into the next day, tracking along the southwestern side of a subtropical ridge over the western Atlantic. More organization occurred, and at 00:00 UTC on September 28, the disturbance became Tropical Depression Nine. Then, that afternoon, the depression strengthened into Tropical Storm Imelda about 180 mi (285 km) south of Great Abaco Island in the northwestern Bahamas, while traversing through 86 °F (30 °C) waters. The storm made landfall on Great Abaco around 12:00 UTC on September 29, with sustained winds of 50 mph (85 km/h).

Late on September 28, Imelda's intensification briefly leveled off due to dry air in the vicinity and moderate wind shear disrupting its structure. Then, early on September 30, deep convection redeveloped on the western side of Imelda. The environment around the storm remained somewhat adverse however, as wind shear and dry air continued. Early that day, Imelda's northward progress slowed, as Hurricane Humberto to its east, created a weakness in the western Atlantic subtropical ridge, and Imelda was steered sharply east-northeastward within the southwesterly flow ahead of an approaching mid-latitude trough over the eastern United States. New inner core convection soon consolidated around the center of Imelda, and it became a Category 1 hurricane by 12:00 UTC. Six hours later, Imelda and Humberto made their closest approach, passing within about 465 mi (750 km) of each other, the second-closest approach by two Atlantic hurricanes on record.

Imelda's structure continued to improve into October 1, and it attained its peak intensity that afternoon, with maximum sustained winds of 90 mph (150 km/h) and minimum central pressure of 966 mb (28.53 inHg) about 410 mi (655 km) west-southwest of Bermuda. Operationally, Imelda was upgraded to a category 2 hurricane during this time based on Hurricane Hunter data, but it was later determined that the storm had already begun its extratropical transition as it interacted with an approaching front, and that the standard wind reduction for the dropsonde data did not represent its true intensity. As a result, the storm was downgraded to category 1 hurricane in the post-storm analysis. Imelda became increasingly entwined with the frontal boundary, which caused its wind field to expand and become asymmetric. Early on October 2, the eye of Imelda brushed the south coast of Bermuda, passing about 5–10 mi (10–20 km) offshore with sustained winds of 90 mph (150 km/h). The system completed its extratropical transition by 12:00 UTC that day, while moving out to sea, east-northeast of Bermuda. The cyclone was subsequently absorbed by another frontal system by the morning of October 6, over the open North Atlantic.

== Preparations and impact ==
=== Lesser Antilles ===
The preceding tropical wave prompted Météo-France to issue a yellow alert for some of France's leeward islands. Schools in the United States Virgin Islands were closed on September 24 due to the expected heavy rain and flood threat due to the disturbance.

In Guadeloupe, heavy rain fell within 24 hours. At least 4.3 inches (110 mm) of rain fell on Pas-du-Roy on Basse-Terre, while rainfall totals reached 1.8 inches (45 mm) in Saint-Félix Gosier on Grande-Terre. La Désirade recorded a total precipitation of 1.8 inches (46 mm) within the same time period. The United States Virgin Islands eventually did not receive a large amount of rain, though the waters south of Saint Croix recorded 5 inches (130 mm) of rain. At least 3,000 customers were left without electricity on the islands as of September 25.

=== Greater Antilles ===
The precursor system caused squalls to the Greater Antilles on September 23 and 24, producing torrential rains which were observed in Puerto Rico and eastern Dominican Republic.

==== Dominican Republic ====
On September 26, five provinces in the Dominican Republic were put under a red alert for rain, while several others were placed under yellow alert. Schools and other educational centers under a flooding threat were also closed on the same day.

The predecessor tropical wave brought heavy rain to the Dominican Republic. The Dajabón River left its banks, causing damage to rice plantations surrounding. Flooding in the Tábara River caused 26 people to be sheltered. Urban floods occurred in Santo Domingo, inundating several streets. The city mobilized 300 officers to clean drainage systems. Trees fell on and obstructed highways in Santo Domingo, Monseñor Nouel, and San Jose do Ocoa. Hundreds of people had to be evacuated in the nation. Two houses were destroyed and almost a thousand were damaged. A tree fell on a house in Barahona. At least 774 people were displaced in Azua. Due to extreme flooding impacting the aqueducts, 400,000 citizens' water supplies were impacted.

==== Cuba ====
Two died in Cuba as a result of Imelda. One man had been reported to have died as a result of landslides. In Eastern Cuba, heavy rains occurred, with four stations reporting more than 7.9 inches (200 mm) of rain. A landslide occurred in Yateras due to heavy rain in the Guatanamo Province. Over 18,000 people were evacuated from the province. Five people were rescued from the Sigua River. Several houses became flooded. Reservoirs in Santiago de Cuba saw an increase in volume by 8,200,000 cubic metres (290,000,000 ft^{3}). Due to flooding and landslides, 17 communities were cut off in the province.

==== Elsewhere ====
In Puerto Rico, a deceased man was found in a river flooded by the proceeding tropical wave in Yauco. One man is missing in Haiti and Imelda caused flooding in 35 communities. Two others were also injured in Haiti.

=== Lucayan Archipelago ===
In anticipation of the storm, tropical storm warnings were issued for the central and northwest Bahamas on September 26. That same day, the Ministry of Education and Technical and Vocational Training closed schools on Acklins, Crooked Island, Inagua, and Mayaguana. Government buildings were closed on September 28 on Abaco, Andros, the Berry Islands, Eleuthera, Exuma, Grand Bahama, Grand Cay, New Providence, and San Salvador Island. The Port of Nassau closed September 25–28, hosting 18 ships. The Margaritaville at Sea arrived early to port before Imelda could arrive. Mandatory evacuation orders were made for Grand Bahama and parts of Abaco. In the East End on Grand Bahama, 110 people evacuated and 47 sought shelter. Western Air suspended flights for September 28. Lynden Pindling International Airport and Grand Bahama International Airport shut down on the same day. Panic buying was reported on Grand Bahama.

Wind gusts reached 83 mph (134 km/h) in Treasure Cay on September 29, and sustained winds of 48 mph (77 km/h) were measured at Little Hog Cay in the Abacos. Some power outages were reported across the islands and power lines were downed. Around 1,500 customers lost power on New Providence. A wide outage was reported on Abaco. On San Salvador, police officers directed the flow of traffic through roads during the storm. The Queens Highways flooded during the storm. Waves surmounted sea walls on San Salvador. Due to flooding across several islands, Bahamasair suspended flights on several islands. On New Providence, streets were flooded to knee-height. Pumping trucks were used on the streets. Fourteen public schools had to be closed due to flooding.

The Turks and Caicos Islands suffered from heavy rains and gusty conditions.

=== United States ===
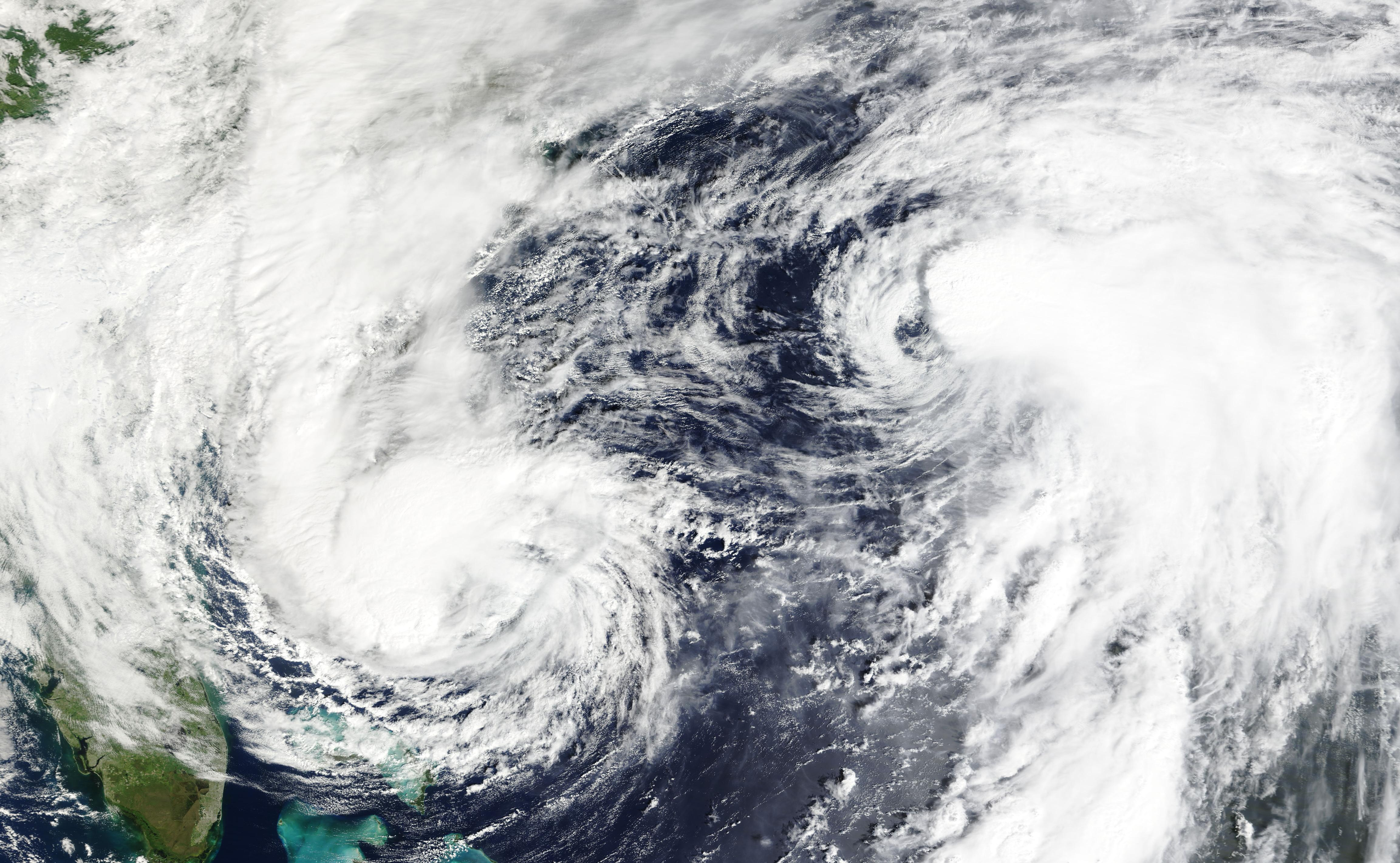
Hurricanes Imelda and Humberto on September 30, 2025. Both systems were near the same intensity at this point.

Parts of the Florida East Coast were placed under a tropical storm watch. High surf and wind advisories were also issued for parts of the state. Ahead of the storm, South Carolina Governor Henry McMaster declared a state of emergency for the state on September 26. North Carolina Governor Josh Stein did the same for his state. The Charleston city council also deployed stormwater pumps in anticipation of the arrival of the storm. Officials in Tybee Island, Georgia, gave out sandbags. Charleston and Savannah also distributed sandbags.

A rip current risk was heightened along the United States East Coast as Imelda, along with Hurricane Humberto to its east, agitated the seas. Imelda pushed rains onto the Florida coast. Turtle hatchlings were reported to have been thrown onto the beach by the seas in Juno Beach. Playalinda Beach of the Canaveral National Seashore was damaged due to Imelda and other storms and would close until November 14. In North Carolina, eight homes collapsed and a portion of North Carolina Highway 12 was flooded from strong waves generated by Imelda and the nearby Hurricane Humberto.

=== Bermuda ===
On September 29, a hurricane watch was issued for Bermuda. A hurricane warning was issued the next day. Trips of the Liberty of the Seas, Carnival Venezia, and Norwegian Aqua to Bermuda were cancelled. Ferry service was halted on the evening of September 30. The Causeway, L.F. Wade International Airport, and government offices were closed and bus service ceased on October 1. Schools were closed October 1 and 2. A shelter was opened at CedarBridge Academy. In total, more than 50 people stayed at shelters across the islands. A hundred soldiers were deployed. In conjunction with Humberto, the threat of Imelda prompted the qualifier for the Butterfield Bermuda Championship to be postponed. The Royal Gazette ceased publication for October 2.

Despite the strong winds, minor damage and no fatalities were reported after the storm. Sustained winds in Bermuda reached 78 mph (125km/h), with gusts to 99 mph (159km/h) at the National Museum of Bermuda. Rainfall on the island totaled around 1.33 inches (34 mm). Widespread fallen trees occurred across Bermuda. A section of the perimeter fence at the L.F. Wade International Airport was toppled by strong winds caused by Imelda. At 09:00 AST on October 2, BELCO reported over 17,700 customers without power. A series of burglaries occurred in Hamilton during Imelda.

== See also ==
- Timeline of the 2025 Atlantic hurricane season
- Tropical cyclones in 2025
- Weather of 2025
- List of Bermuda hurricanes
- List of North Carolina hurricanes (2000–present)
