= Tropical Storm Barry (2025) =

Atlantic tropical storm in 2025

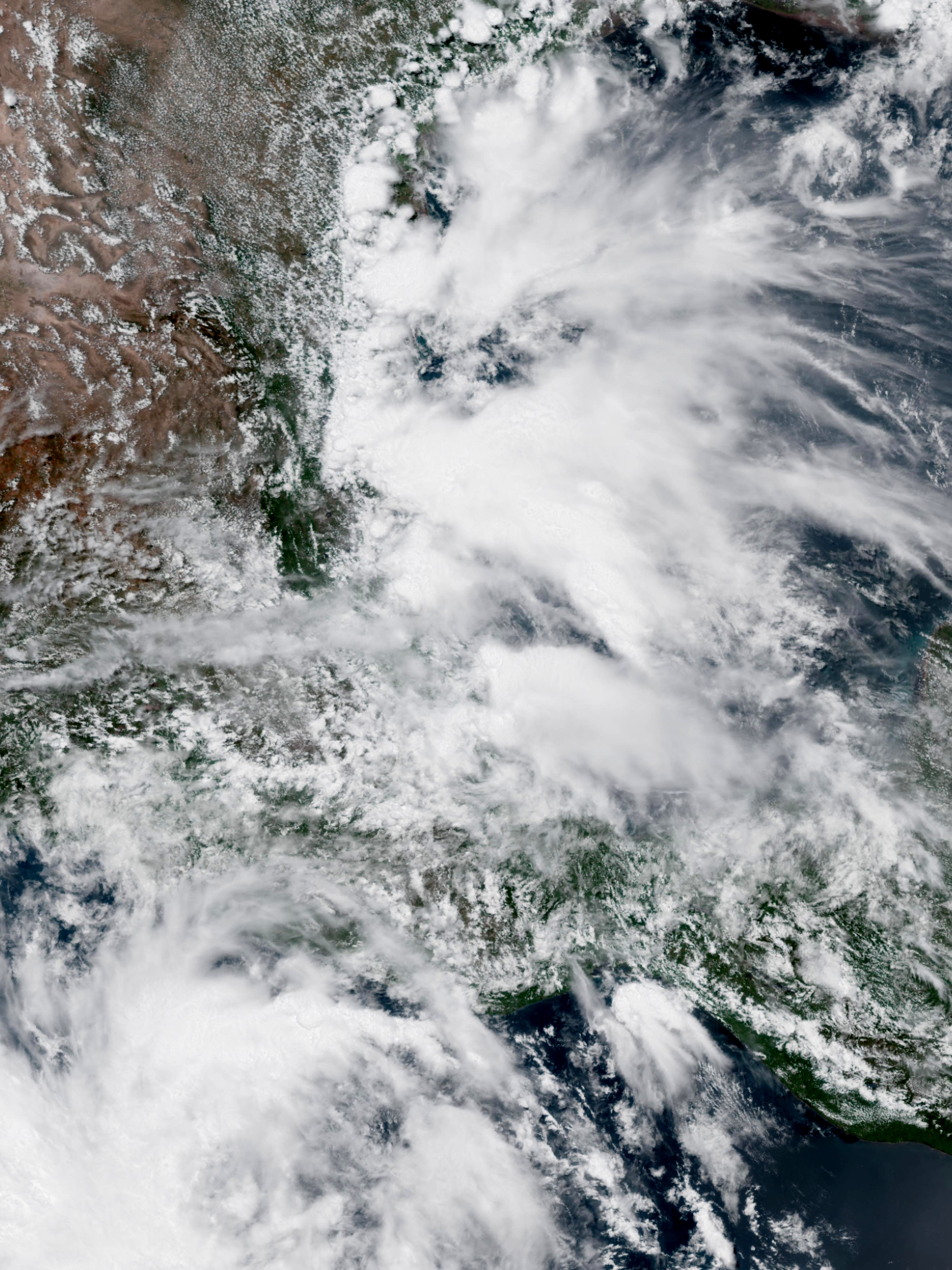
- Barry at peak intensity in the Bay of Campeche on June 29

Meteorological history
- Formed: June 28, 2025
- Dissipated: June 30, 2025

Tropical storm
- 1-minute sustained (SSHWS/NWS)
- Highest winds: 45 mph (75 km/h)
- Lowest pressure: 1006 mbar (hPa); 29.71 inHg

Overall effects
- Fatalities: 8 total
- Damage: >$5.87 million (2025 USD)
- Areas affected: Belize, Yucatan Peninsula, Eastern Mexico, South Texas, West Texas
- IBTrACS
- Part of the 2025 Atlantic hurricane season

Tropical Storm Barry was a short-lived tropical cyclone that caused significant flooding in southeastern Mexico. The second named storm of the 2025 Atlantic hurricane season, Barry developed on June 28, 2025, from a tropical wave over the Bay of Campeche. Prior to formation, Barry's precursor disturbance caused flooding on the Yucatan Peninsula and Belize. After forming, Barry strengthened slightly and reached peak intensity with maximum sustained winds of 45 miles per hour (72 km/h) and a minimum central pressure of 1,006 mb (29.7 inHg) while approaching the Mexican state of Veracruz. The storm then weakened to a tropical depression before making landfall near Tampico, Tamaulipas. The short-lived storm dissipated shortly after landfall over the rugged terrain of Mexico.

Barry was responsible for eight deaths in Mexico, one in Tamaulipas, two in Veracruz, and five in San Luis Potosí, as well as causing at least US$5.87 million in damage. Throughout Mexico, floodwaters inundated thousands of homes and schools. Additionally, numerous roads were destroyed by landslides and overflowing sewage canals. Damage was most severe in the state of San Luis Potosí, where over 1,500 homes were damaged by floodwaters. Remnant moisture of Barry later merged with tropical east Pacific remnant moisture over the U.S. state of Texas, which brought torrential rainfall for several days.

== Meteorological history ==
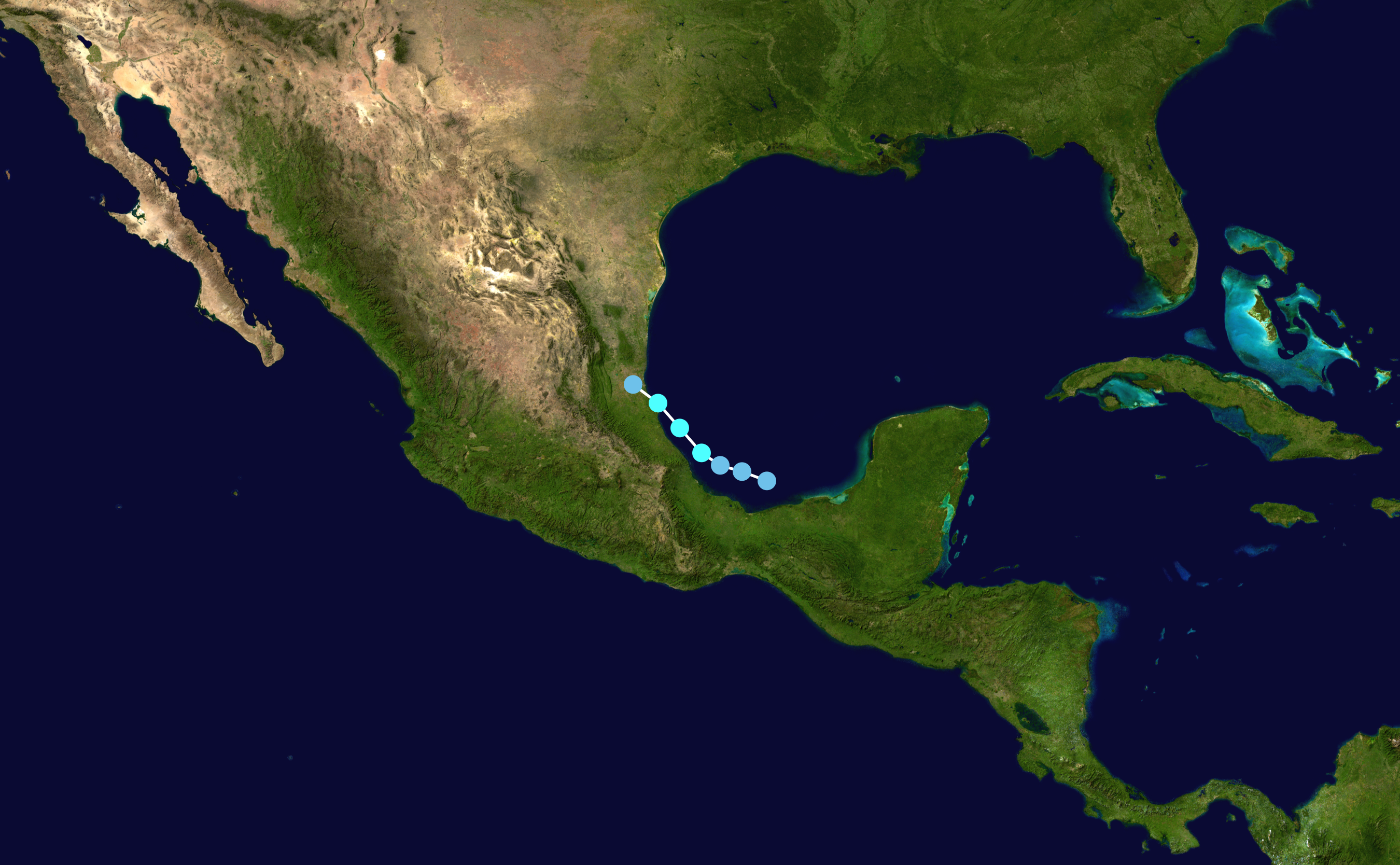
Map plotting the storm's track and intensity, according to the Saffir–Simpson scale Map key Saffir–Simpson scale Tropical depression (≤38 mph, ≤62 km/h) Tropical storm (39–73 mph, 63–118 km/h) Category 1 (74–95 mph, 119–153 km/h) Category 2 (96–110 mph, 154–177 km/h) Category 3 (111–129 mph, 178–208 km/h) Category 4 (130–156 mph, 209–251 km/h) Category 5 (≥157 mph, ≥252 km/h) Unknown Storm type Tropical cyclone Subtropical cyclone Extratropical cyclone, remnant low, tropical disturbance, or monsoon depression

On June 27, a broad area of low pressure formed over the Yucatán Peninsula. As the disturbance emerged into the Bay of Campeche the following morning, a well-defined surface circulation began developing; also, its shower and thunderstorm activity began to show signs of organization. Sea surface temperatures were conductive for development at 29 °C (84 °F). This trend continued, resulting in the formation of Tropical Depression Two that afternoon. The system became Tropical Storm Barry on the morning of June 29, about 90 mi (140 km) east-southeast of Tuxpan, Veracruz. The storm moved northwestward, steered by a stationary low-to-mid level ridge in the central Gulf of Mexico. Barry could not become very intense due to high 25–30 mph (40–48 km/h) wind shear. That same evening, Barry made landfall south of Tampico, Tamaulipas, and weakened to a tropical depression. Inland, Barry's low-level circulation soon dissipated over the mountains of northeastern Mexico.

== Preparations and impact ==
Effects by country
Country	State/district	Fatalities	Damage (in USD)
Belize	–	0	Unknown
Mexico	Quintana Roo	0	$1.88 million
Mexico	Veracruz	2	$268,000
Mexico	Tamaulipas	1	$3.49 million
Mexico	San Luis Potosí	5	Unknown
United States	Texas	0	$225,000
Total		8	$5.87 million

Aon estimated the damages would be greater than US$1 million.

=== Mexico ===
On the morning of June 28, several municipalities on the Yucatan Peninsula experienced storms and winds of 15 to 30 kilometres per hour (9.3 to 19 mph) due to the precursor wave of Barry. A maximum of 428 mm (16.9 in) of rain fell. In Chetumal, 40 roads were destroyed. More than 10,000 hectares of sugarcane were lost. The city's drainage system became saturated with water. More than 240 families were left homeless. Total damages from the flooding are estimated at Mex$35 million (US$1.88 million).

Upon its formation as a tropical cyclone, the NHC issued tropical storm warnings from Boca de Catán to Tecolutla. Flood warnings were issued for Veracruz in preparation for Barry. Over 100 shelters were opened in Tamaulipas as over 50,000 were put at risk due to floods. Barry's approach led to the Ministry of Education in Tamaulipas bringing forward the end of the 2024–25 school year and suspending classes. A yellow alert was issued for northern Veracruz while a blue alert was issued for the south. The state suspended classes in 51 municipalities for June 30.

In Veracruz, schools were damaged and power outages were reported. In Los Tuxtlas, more than 370 mm (14.6 in) of rain fell. Twelve municipalities were affected and seven homes were damaged. However, overall damage in Veracruz was minor, totaling to Mex$5 million (US$268,000). In the city of Veracruz, two people were killed after rough surf caused by Barry swept them out to sea in their car.

In Tamaulipas, rainfall and winds caused flooding and damage. In some areas of the state, 200 mm (7.87 in) of rain fell. Three neighborhoods in Tampico were flooded. The Tamesí River overflowed, resulting in 5,000 families being affected. Two trees fell in the city, damaging electrical lines and a fence. In Ciudad Victoria, outer rain bands from Barry triggered street flooding in low lying areas. A pedestrian bridge collapsed in Tamiahua as a result of the storm. At least 300 tons of salt were lost, affecting more than 40 farmers. Thirteen schools were flooded. Significant losses in the transportation sector were reported from road closures. Over 189 neighborhoods and 500 homes were flooded. Numerous state and federal highways damaged. Damage to roads is estimated at Mex$65 million (US$3.49 million), with Mex$40 million (US$2.15 million) of damage being done to state highways and Mex$25 million (US$1.34 million) of damage being done to federal highways. Landslides left 28 rural communities isolated. A man was killed after his car was swept away by an overflowing sewage canal. Over 108 crocodiles were sighted and captured.

In San Luis Potosí, the remnants of Barry caused a stream to overflow, flooding streets. Damage was reported in at least seven municipalities. In Santa María del Río, fallen trees were reported. Damage was reported in at least seven municipalities. Water levels rose to 1.6 m (5.25 ft). Over 400 homes were damaged in the Loma Bonita neighborhood of Tamazunchale. In Axtla de Terrazas, over 1,500 homes were flooded. Five streams overflowed, isolating three communities and 50 families. The remnants also caused flooding in the Huasteca region, with currents dragging vehicles into the water. At least five people were killed in the state: three people were swept away by an overflowing river while riding a razor-type vehicle, and a minor was killed after being swept away by an overflowing river while riding in a car. At least 33 people had to be evacuated to shelters. The contamination of waterways affected crab and oyster farmers. More than 30 vehicles were damaged. The government allocated Mex$6.2 million (US$333,000) to support recovery efforts from the storm. In Puebla, rising waters forced residents to evacuate from their homes. Street flooding stalled vehicles, prompting water-related rescues.

=== Elsewhere ===
In Belize, severe damage was reported to infrastructure with numerous buildings collapsing in rural communities due to the precursor to Barry. No deaths were reported. Numerous landslides were reported and flooding affected more than 20 communities. Over 20 in (508 mm) of rain fell in some areas, causing water levels to rise at least 50 cm (19.7 in), a number not seen in 18 years. Families were forced to evacuate flooded homes and roads were damaged by mudslides. Orange Walk, Corozal, and Cayo District saw the most severe impacts.

Despite being far from Barry, North Padre Island, Texas, experienced some effects. Gusty winds toppled beach canopies and tents; rough surf was also reported. Days later, remnant moisture from the storm moved into Texas, contributing to several days of thunderstorms. An average of 4.75 in (121 mm) of rain fell in Brownsville, 3.55 in (90 mm) of rain fell in Harlingen, and 1.69 in (43 mm) of rain fell in McAllen between June 28 and July 2. In Reeves County, minor street flooding was reported. In Midland County, 21 vehicles stalled in floodwaters, with damage estimated at US$175,000. In Brewster County, one home was flooded, with damage estimated at US$50,000. Additionally, people at campgrounds in the Big Bend region had to be evacuated due to flooding.

Initially, media reports indicated remnant moisture from Barry played a significant role in fueling the thunderstorms that caused the July 2025 Central Texas floods. However, the NHC later determined that the remnants of Barry were not the primary cause of the flooding.

== See also ==
- Weather of 2025
- Tropical cyclones in 2025
- Timeline of the 2025 Atlantic hurricane season
- Other storms with the same name
- List of Mexico hurricanes
