= Tropical Storm Chantal (2025) =

Atlantic tropical storm in 2025

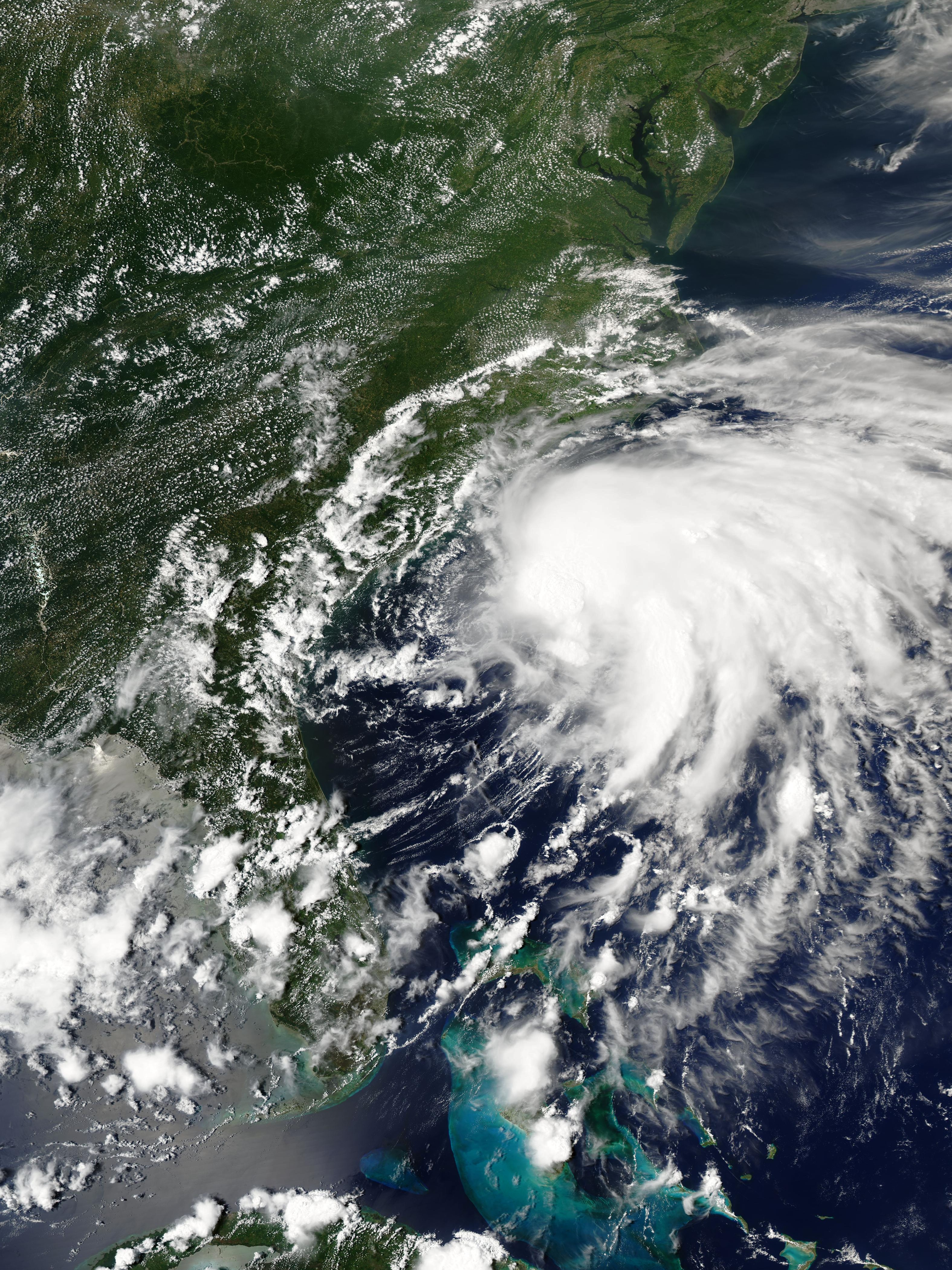
- Chantal near peak intensity approaching the Southeastern United States on July 5

Meteorological history
- Formed: July 4, 2025
- Remnant low: July 7, 2025
- Dissipated: July 8, 2025

Tropical storm
- 1-minute sustained (SSHWS/NWS)
- Highest winds: 60 mph (95 km/h)
- Lowest pressure: 1002 mbar (hPa); 29.59 inHg

Overall effects
- Fatalities: 6 total
- Damage: $500 million (2025 USD)
- Areas affected: Southeastern United States (Particularly the Carolinas), Mid-Atlantic, Northeastern United States
- Part of the 2025 Atlantic hurricane season

Tropical Storm Chantal (/ʃɑːnˈtɑːl/ shahn-TAHL) was a tropical cyclone that impacted the Southeastern United States in July 2025. Chantal originated from a decaying frontal boundary over Florida. It then moved offshore into the Atlantic Ocean and rapidly organized into a tropical depression on July 4. The next day, the system became better organized and was upgraded to tropical storm status, being assigned the name Chantal. The system steadily intensified until landfall early on July 6 in South Carolina, rapidly weakening into a tropical depression inland later that day.

Chantal produced tropical storm force-winds and gusts in northeastern South Carolina as it made landfall. Chantal produced heavy rainfall as it slowly moved into North Carolina, exceeding 10 inches (250 mm) in Alamance, Chatham, and Orange counties. Significant flash flooding took place across central North Carolina late on July 6. Losses totaled to US$500 million according to Gallagher Re.

== Meteorological history ==
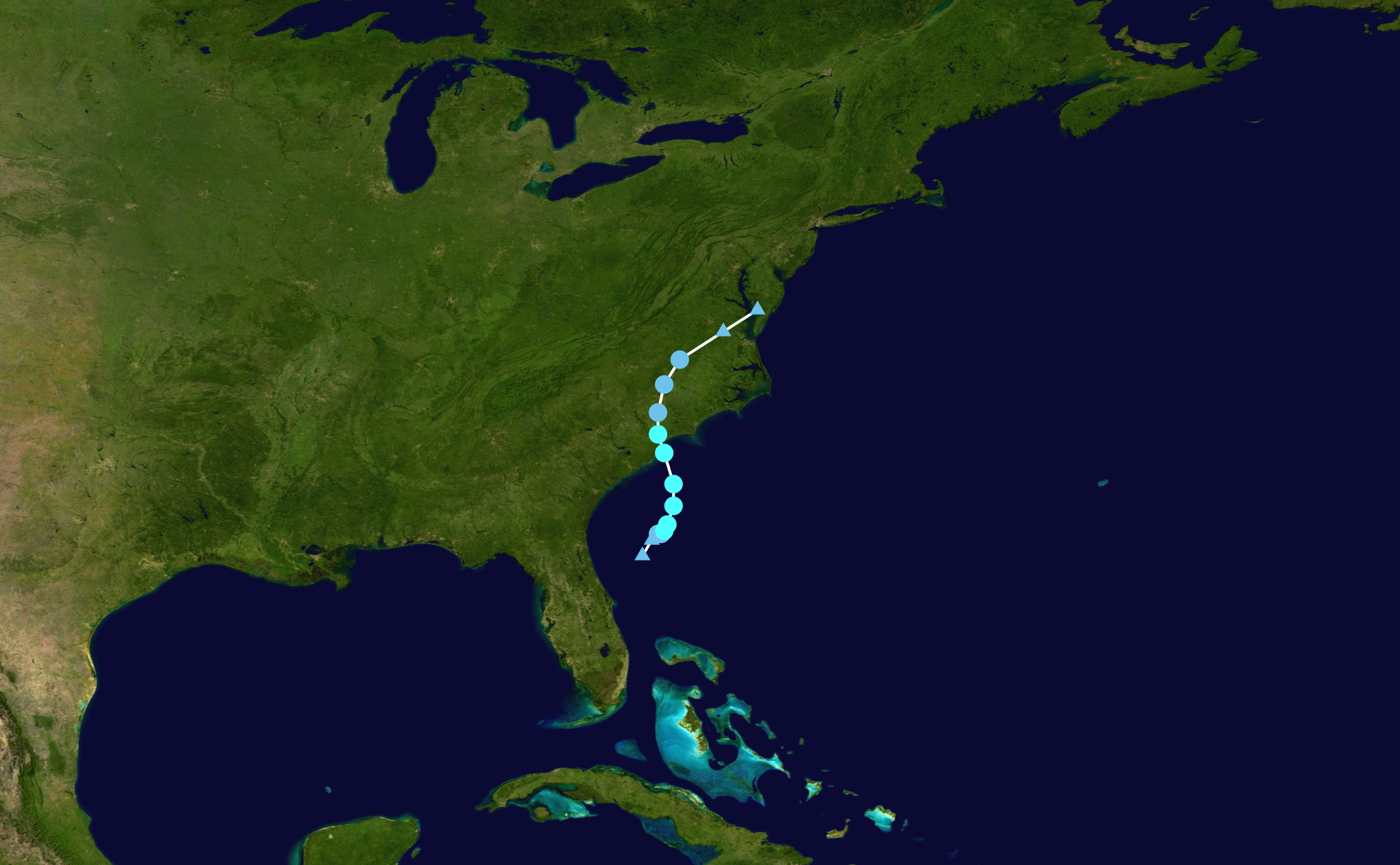
Map plotting the storm's track and intensity, according to the Saffir–Simpson scale Map key Saffir–Simpson scale Tropical depression (≤38 mph, ≤62 km/h) Tropical storm (39–73 mph, 63–118 km/h) Category 1 (74–95 mph, 119–153 km/h) Category 2 (96–110 mph, 154–177 km/h) Category 3 (111–129 mph, 178–208 km/h) Category 4 (130–156 mph, 209–251 km/h) Category 5 (≥157 mph, ≥252 km/h) Unknown Storm type Tropical cyclone Subtropical cyclone Extratropical cyclone, remnant low, tropical disturbance, or monsoon depression

In early July, a frontal boundary began to decay in the northern Gulf of Mexico and off the coast of the Southeastern United States. The front became a trough as the temperature gradient of the surroundings declined. Through July 1–2, the trough passed over the Florida Peninsula moving northeastward, bringing rainfall there. On July 3, after a piece of the trough passed over the peninsula, thunderstorm activity increased. Wind shear in the region was weak at the time, and sea surface temperatures were seasonably warm, around 82 to 84 °F (28 to 29 °C). At around 18:00 UTC on July 4, scatterometer data indicated that the area of low pressure while showing a significant burst of deep convection on GOES-19 infrared imagery, becoming defined as a tropical depression. The storm strengthened to Tropical Storm Chantal at 06:00 UTC on July 5.

When Chantal formed, steering currents were light and variable due to a mid-latitude cyclone moving off of the New England coast, weakening a ridge. Once the trough moved away, the ridge restrengthened and Chantal began moving northwestward on July 5. On July 5, environmental conditions were not particularly favorable for development, though gradual intensification ensued. There was moderate wind shear and dry air infiltration on the west side of the system. NEXRAD and hurricane hunter data indicated that Chantal rose to peak intensity at 06:00 UTC on July 6 with 60 mph (97 km/h) while around 25 miles (40 km) south of Myrtle Beach. Dropsonde data indicated that Chantal achieved its lowest pressure of 1,002 millibars slightly earlier. Convection was mostly in the north of the storm at this time, weakening as it approached the coast. Chantal made landfall near Litchfield Beach, South Carolina with 50 mph (80 km/h) sustained winds around 08:00 UTC on July 6. Moving inland, Chantal returned to tropical depression status by 12:00 UTC. The atmosphere was moist with moderate wind shear, allowing for significant rainfall in the Raleigh metropolitan area. Convection weakened on July 7, with Chantal becoming a post-tropical cyclone. The cyclone moved northeastward through Virginia before becoming a trough off of the Delmarva Peninsula.

== Preparations and impact ==
=== Carolinas ===
Radar loop of Tropical Storm Chantal at landfall in South Carolina between July 5–6

Upon formation on July 4, tropical storm watches were issued from Edisto Beach, South Carolina to Little River Inlet, also in South Carolina. This is where the storm affected the most people. On July 5, they were upgraded to tropical storm warnings from the South Santee River to Cape Fear. The warning was eventually extended north to Surf City. The South Carolina Department of Transportation moved crews to areas to be impacted by Chantal.

Tropical Storm Chantal increased the rip current threat off the Carolina coast. On July 4, 11 people had to be rescued due to rip currents. Lifeguards around the Grand Strand performed rescues to people who went through the rough waters off the coast. A peak wind gust of 56 miles per hour (90 km/h) on Springmaid Pier, in Myrtle Beach, South Carolina was recorded. Around 4–6 inches (100–150 mm) of rainfall was measured in Horry County.

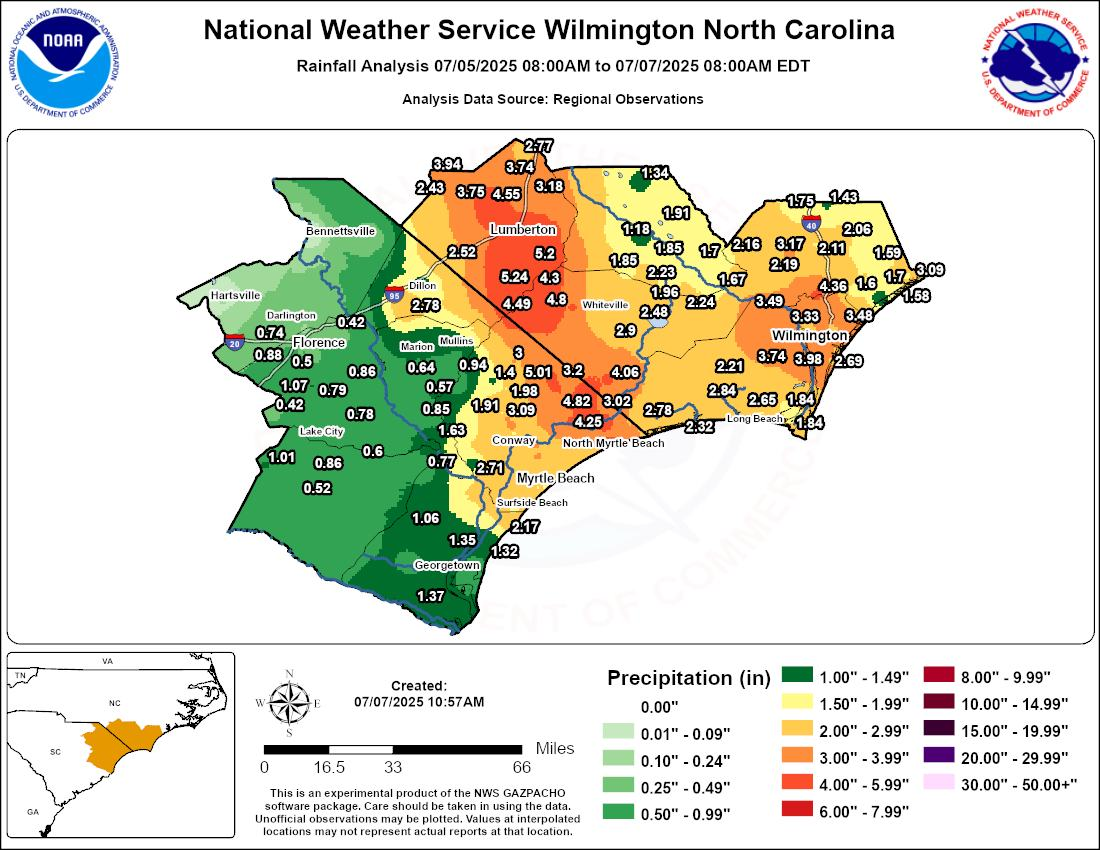
Rainfall totals from Tropical Storm Chantal for southeastern North Carolina and northeastern South Carolina

In North Carolina, as much as 11 inches (280 mm) of rain fell across the state. Four EF1 tornadoes and an EF0 tornado were also confirmed. About 8 inches (200 mm) fell in Moore County, resulting in the closure of two highways and two water rescues in Aberdeen. A Kohl's and a connecting shopping center were evacuated after a retaining wall failure caused flooding in Southern Pines. Some public housing in Chapel Hill was evacuated, lying in a floodprone area, with residents being temporarily housed in hotels. Another nearby dam failure damaged roads. A tree was also downed onto a home in Aberdeen. A state of emergency was issued for Moore County. An EF1 tornado in Sanford damaged two hangars and two aircraft at the Raleigh Executive Jetport, while toppling trees and power lines at a neighboring mobile home park. That tornado caused $2 million in damage. Another EF1 tornado was confirmed in Chatham County, where several water rescues also took place. Over 100 roads were damaged in or around Chatham County. One person was killed after their car was swept away by floodwaters in the county. Another died in Orange County when her car was submerged. A man's body was recovered from running water after his car ran off the road in Alamance County. A woman in Graham was found dead with her car in a pond. Additionally, two boaters went missing at Jordan Lake amidst the storm, both of whom were later found deceased.

A gas station near I-85 in Orange County was inundated by floodwaters. A state of emergency was declared by the county as a result of flooding. Voluntary evacuations were also issued in Mebane due to concerns of a dam failure. Rain from Chantal led to the Eno River rising to 25.64 feet (7.82 m), the highest ever recorded. As a result of the Eno River flooding, 80 people had to be rescued in Durham County. Another 50 were rescued in Chapel Hill. The Haw River in Burlington, North Carolina similarly rose to 32.5 feet (9.9 m), a few inches short of its record from Hurricane Fran. In Lee County, numerous mobile homes were destroyed and strong winds uprooted trees. A portion of NC 902 was shut down due to part of the road being washed away from the heavy rain and flooding. Parts of I-40 where partially shut down. By July 7, 120 roads remained closed. Three trails in Chapel Hill were damaged, with significant damage along Bolin Creek and Morgan Creek. According to Duke Energy, thousands of customers were left without power due to Chantal. Amtrak rail service was also temporarily shut down in the central part of North Carolina. Severe flooding damage at their transmitter sites forced two Chapel Hill, North Carolina radio stations, WCHL and WLLQ, off the air. Paperhand Puppet Intervention suffered losses of US$100,000 as a result of the storm.

In the aftermath of Chantal, the News & Observer reported real estate companies purchasing properties under market value and flipping them for a high value. The newspaper also noted that communities affected were usually poorer and non-English speaking.

=== Elsewhere ===
Satellite loop of the remnants of Tropical Storm Chantal re-emerging off the Eastern Seaboard on July 7.

The predecessor to Chantal brought high humidity, cloudy conditions, and rain to Florida. Several celebrations for the United States' Independence Day were cancelled in Florida on July 3 as a result of rainfall from the predecessor to Chantal. Northeast Florida was also affected by rip currents from Chantal.

The Mid-Atlantic also experienced strong surf and rip tides. Flood watches were issued for several Mid-Atlantic states, extending as far north as New Jersey, as Chantal and remnant moisture affected the region between July 7–8. In addition, flash flood warnings were issued for several counties in southern and central Virginia. Strong wind gusts affected Maryland from thunderstorms in association with Chantal's remnants on July 8, with peak gusts reaching 70 miles per hour (110 km/h) in Kingstown. More than 18,000 customers were affected by power outages across Maryland. A game between the Baltimore Orioles and New York Mets at Camden Yards was delayed because of the storms.

Up to 4.3 in (110 mm) of rain fell in the Philadelphia metropolitan area, and a ground stop was issued at Philadelphia International Airport on July 7. Part of I-76 was flooded in Philadelphia. More than 35,000 people lost electricity in both New Jersey and Pennsylvania. Several trees were downed across New Jersey. A tornado warning was issued for parts of Monmouth and Ocean counties during the storm. New York experienced downpours and occasionally heavy rain in some spots of the NYC metropolitan area; lingering humidity caused by moisture associated with Chantal led to heat advisories issued across the Tri-state area on July 8. John F. Kennedy International Airport saw 29 flight cancellations and over 200 delays on July 7 due to the threat of impacts from Chantal's remnants. A microburst downed several trees and power lines in Bantam and Litchfield, Connecticut.

== See also ==
- Weather of 2025
- Tropical cyclones in 2025
- Timeline of the 2025 Atlantic hurricane season
- Other storms of the same name
- List of South Carolina hurricanes
- List of North Carolina hurricanes (2000–present)
