= Hurricane Gabrielle (2025) =

Category 4 Atlantic hurricane in 2025

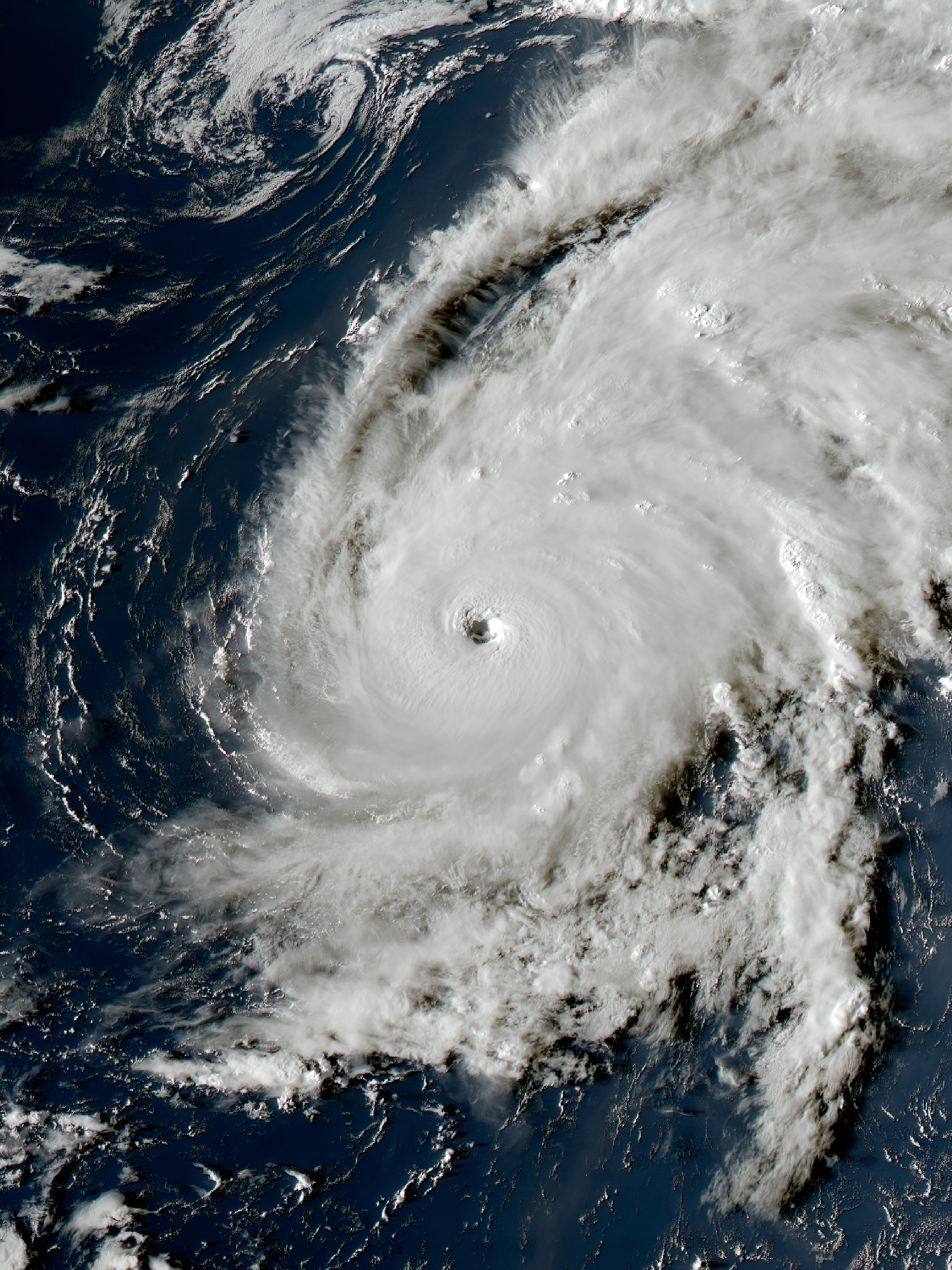
- Gabrielle at peak intensity east of Bermuda on 22 September

Meteorological history
- Formed: 17 September 2025
- Extratropical: 25 September 2025
- Dissipated: 29 September 2025

Category 4 major hurricane
- 1-minute sustained (SSHWS/NWS)
- Highest winds: 140 mph (220 km/h)
- Lowest pressure: 944 mbar (hPa); 27.88 inHg

Overall effects
- Fatalities: None
- Damage: $17.1 million (2025 USD)
- Areas affected: East Coast of the United States, Bermuda, Azores, Iberian Peninsula, Balearic Islands)
- IBTrACS
- Part of the 2025 Atlantic hurricane and 2025–26 European windstorm seasons

Hurricane Gabrielle, known as Storm Gabrielle while extratropical, was a powerful tropical cyclone that threatened Bermuda, and later affected the Azores as a post-tropical cyclone in September 2025. The seventh named storm, second hurricane, and second major hurricane of the 2025 Atlantic hurricane season, Gabrielle formed from a long-tracked tropical wave in the central Atlantic on 17 September. Due to dry air and wind shear that had stifled its development, the system was initially disorganized with an ill-defined center. These same factors prevented further organization for multiple days following its formation. Gabrielle intensified into a hurricane on 21 September as conditions became much more favorable, before it rapidly intensified the following day, peaking as a Category 4 hurricane east of Bermuda. After maintaining for a day, increasingly hostile factors such as dry air and wind shear caused weakening to commence, weakening to a tropical storm just west of the Azores early on 25 September, becoming extratropical later that day as it passed over the island chain. The remnants of Gabrielle gradually spun down until moving ashore on the Iberian Peninsula on 28 September, dissipating later that day.

Although Gabrielle did not affect Bermuda directly, high swells produced by the hurricane still affected the islands as well as the East Coast of the United States. A hurricane warning was issued in advance of the storm in the Azores and multiple flights halted as a result, even though Gabrielle ultimately passed through as an extratropical cyclone. Gabrielle's remnants, after merging with another system, also went on to cause flooding on Mainland Europe.

== Meteorological history ==
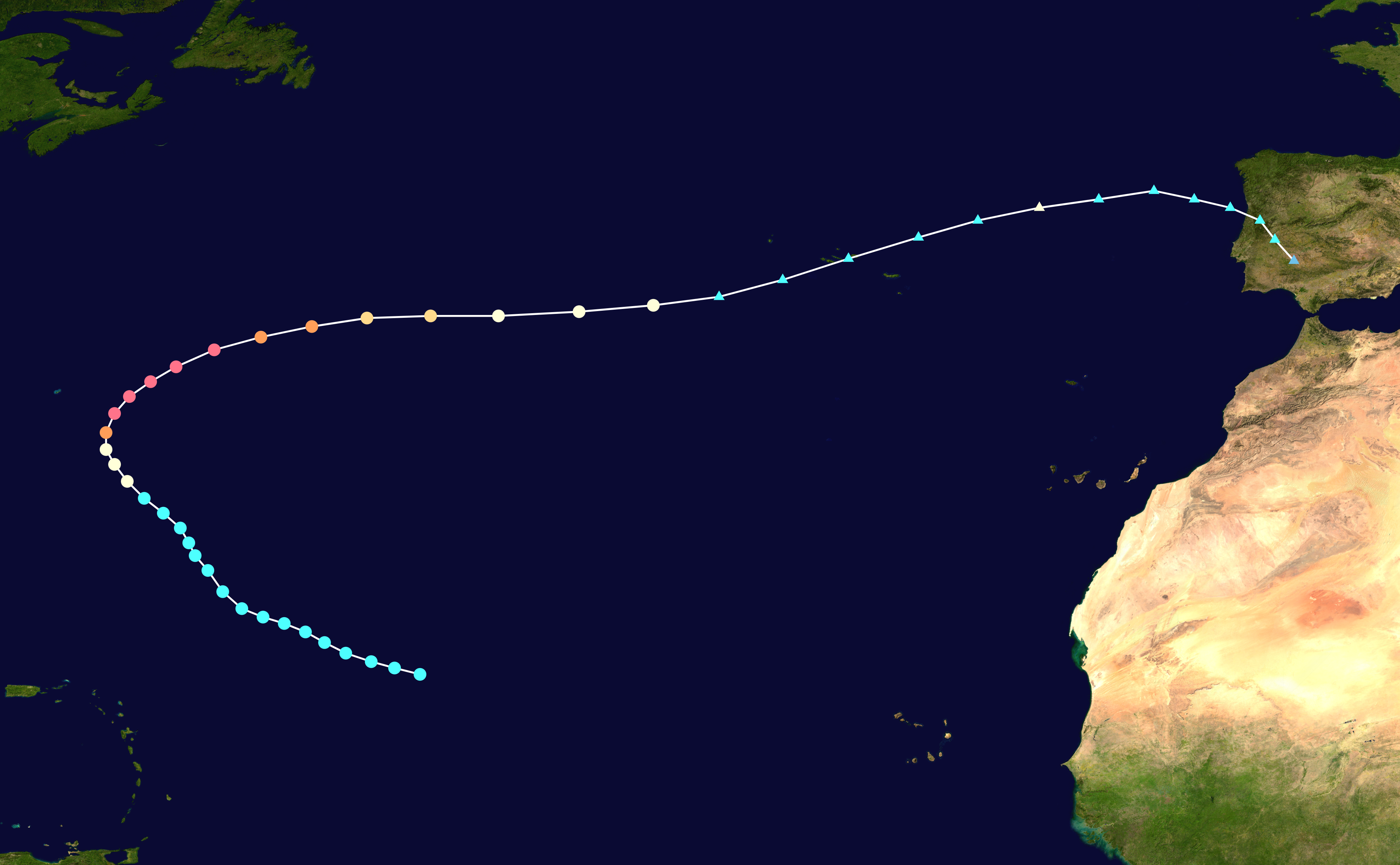
Map plotting the storm's track and intensity, according to the Saffir–Simpson scale Map key Saffir–Simpson scale Tropical depression (≤38 mph, ≤62 km/h) Tropical storm (39–73 mph, 63–118 km/h) Category 1 (74–95 mph, 119–153 km/h) Category 2 (96–110 mph, 154–177 km/h) Category 3 (111–129 mph, 178–208 km/h) Category 4 (130–156 mph, 209–251 km/h) Category 5 (≥157 mph, ≥252 km/h) Unknown Storm type Tropical cyclone Subtropical cyclone Extratropical cyclone, remnant low, tropical disturbance, or monsoon depression

On 12 September, a tropical wave moved off of the continent of Africa. The wave remained disorganized until 14 September, when the southern portion of the wave began organizing halfway between Africa and the Leeward Islands. Per scatterometer data, the wave attained gale-force winds on 16 September. On 17 September, the southern portion of the wave attempted to organize, but failed. There were multiple swirls embedded within the northern sector of the wave, and the system's structure closely resembled a monsoon depression at the time. An upper-level trough would then incite deep convection in the northern portion of the wave, where it would become Tropical Storm Gabrielle at 18:00 UTC later that day. Gabrielle initially struggled to become better organized due to high wind shear. At the time, the storm was being steered west-northwestward by a subtropical ridge over the central Atlantic. Wind shear subsided on 19 September, allowing for some intensification, still somewhat inhibited by dry air intruding. Convection also improved on the night of 19 September. On 20 September, Gabrielle encountered warmer sea surface temperatures, (SSTs) also aiding in intensification. On 21 September, an inner core formed and mid-level conditions became more humid, allowing for rapid intensification.

Gabrielle strengthening into a major hurricane

Gabrielle strengthened into a Category 1 hurricane at 18:00 UTC on 21 September and rapidly into a Category 4 hurricane with peak sustained winds of 140 miles per hour (230 km/h) at 00:00 UTC on 23 September about 180 miles (290 km) east of Bermuda. Gabrielle's estimated lowest pressure is 944 millibars based on the Knaff-Zehr-Courtney wind-pressure relationship. Gabrielle began losing strength through 23 and 24 September as it encountered cooler SSTs and stronger wind shear. Gabrielle's intensity dropped back to Category 1 strength early on 25 September. Most of its deep convection collapsed as further weakening occurred that afternoon while Gabrielle approached the Azores. Gabrielle lost its tropical characteristics at 18:00 UTC on 25 September, still southwest of the Azores. Gabrielle's center moved over the islands 26 September, with hurricane-force wind gusts. It was noted during this time that some deep convection redeveloped northeast of its center, likely due to an occluded frontal boundary nearby. The extratropical system briefly regained hurricane-force sustained winds on 27 September. The low began to slow and weaken, passing over Portugal and opening into a trough over Spain on 28 September.

== Preparations and impacts ==
=== Bermuda and United States ===
The Bermuda Weather Service issued a small craft warning during the passage of Gabrielle. Bermuda and the East Coast of the United States northward of North Carolina experienced rough seas and heightened rip current risks as a result of Gabrielle. Red flags were raised to indicate dangerous conditions in Bermuda.

=== Azores ===
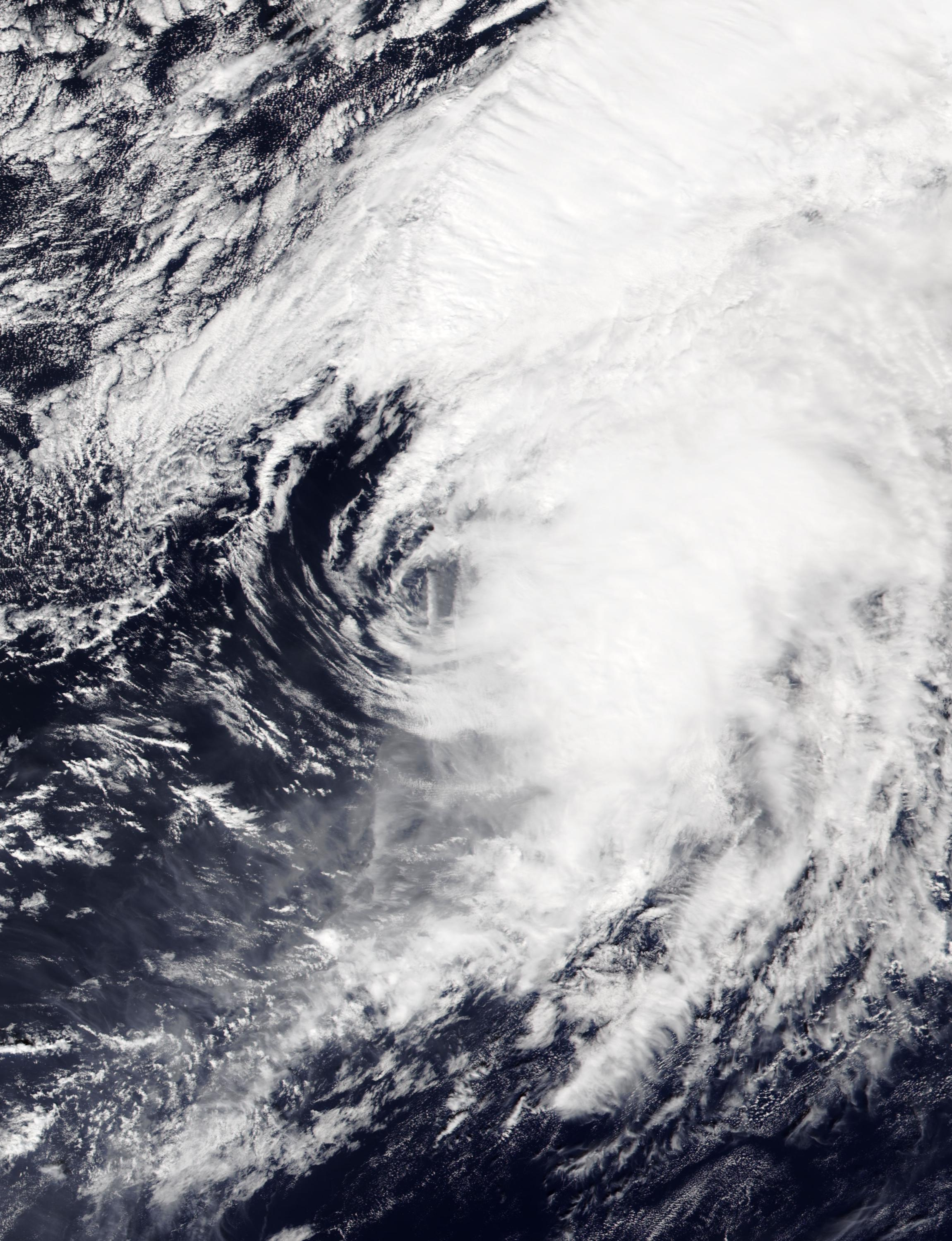
Ex-Gabrielle near the Azores during the evening of 25 September.

A hurricane watch was issued for the Azores on 22 September, which was later upgraded to a warning on the 24 September. The IPMA issued orange and yellow alerts for all of the Azores. Flores and Corvo were placed under a red alert for precipitation. Terceira, Faial, Pico, São Jorge, and Graciosa were placed under a red alert for wind and rough seas. Orange alerts were eventually issued for the eastern islands. Schools and government buildings in the central and western Azores were closed for Gabrielle. Ports in Madalena, Lajes, and Horta were closed. The Regional Civil Protection Service organized rescue teams, medical units, and supplies in high-risk communities.

Flight plans were interrupted from 25 to 27 September in the Azores. Azores Airlines cancelled flights from Ponta Delgada to Terceira and Lisbon.

Overall, Gabrielle inflicted generally minor damage in the Azores. Serra de Santa Bárbara, located in the mountains of Terceira Island, reported wind gusts of 115 mph (185 km/h). At lower elevations, the highest gust was 96 mph (154 km/h) on Faial. Sustained winds on Pico dos Santos de Cima, on São Miguel, reported sustained winds of 78 mph (125 km/h). The highest rate of rainfall was recorded of Graciosa at 21 millimeters (0.83 in) per hour, totaling 60.9 millimetres (2.40 in) throughout. Waves attained heights of 10 to 18 meters (33 to 59 ft). Across the islands, trees fell, structures collapsed, and roofs were damaged. Sixteen people were displaced due to Gabrielle including four on São Jorge, three on Faial, and one on Graciosa. An aerodrome on Graciosa was damaged, inhibiting flights. Two hundred structures sustained minor roof damage.

=== Europe ===
The Generalitat Valenciana issued mobile alerts to citizens in at-risk communities and mobilized emergency coordination centers. Schools were suspended in the Valencian Community, affecting 536,000 students. The Government of the Balearic Islands also suspended schools. A red alert for rain was issued for Ibiza and Formentera.

Strong winds from Gabrielle increased the wildfire risk in Iberia. Gabrielle brought windy and rainy conditions to the Iberian Peninsula, with the most extreme conditions in the east of Spain. In Amposta, 244 millimetres (9.6 in) of rain fell in 24 hours. Firefighters rescued citizens from homes. Several roads and railroads were closed or disrupted by inundations. Power outages were reported in the Province of Tarragona. The south coast of the United Kingdom was plagued by rough seas. Severe flooding occurred on Ibiza, triggered by the remnants of Gabrielle fused with another mid-latitude cyclone. Red flags were flown on Ibiza's beaches. Several homes and businesses were flooded. Around 50 people were rescued from vehicles on the island. More than 132 flood related incidents were reported. The partial collapse of a mountain left four people trapped in a hotel, three of whom were injured. Additionally, two others were left seriously injured. A total of 220 guests had to be evacuated due to the damage. Additionally, two others were rescued after being trapped in an elevator. Additionally, a hospital suffered considerable water damage from the storm. More than 1,200 people lost power. Water leaked through the roof of the Ibiza Airport. Additionally, fabric businesses suffered significant commercial losses from the storm. A ferry had trouble docking at a port due to rough seas generated by the storm. Occupants at a school were evacuated after water entered the basement of the building, damaging the electrical system of the school. The Ibiza Gran Hotel was forced to temporarily close after the electrical installations of the structure sustained severe damage. Roads to the airport prevented 980 travelers from reaching their flights on time. The desalinization plant of the city was shut down due to the flooding. In the aftermath of the storm, 152 personnel were mobilized to support recovery efforts. A Ryanair flight was forced to abort a landing due to inclement weather caused by the storm. Additionally, several tunnels and a bus station were flooded. Material damage in Ibiza from Gabrielle totaled to €14.4 million (US$17.1 million).

== See also ==
- List of Category 4 Atlantic hurricanes
- Weather of 2025
- Tropical cyclones in 2025
- Timeline of the 2025 Atlantic hurricane season
- Other storms named Gabrielle
- List of Azores hurricanes
