= 2025 Atlantic hurricane season =

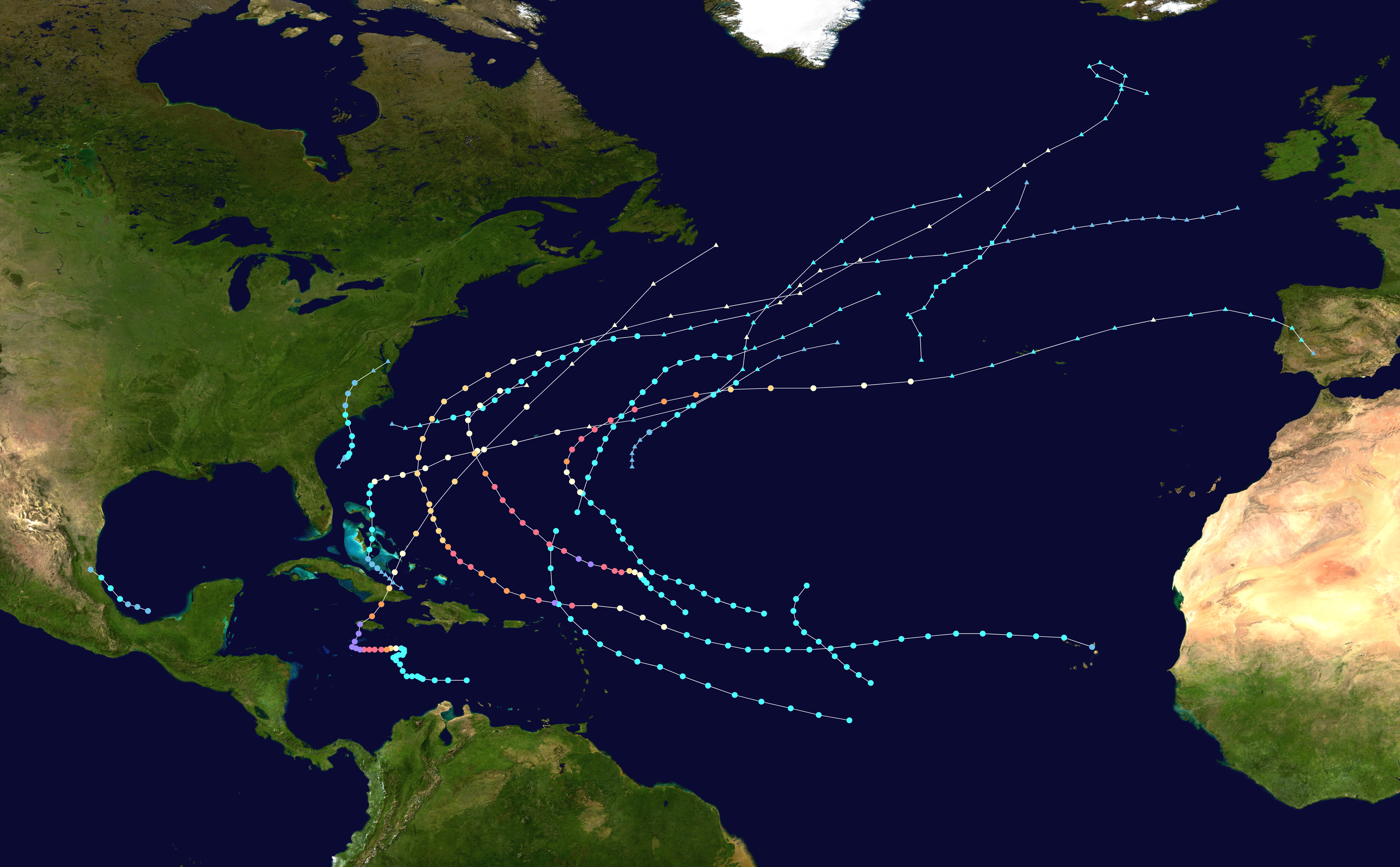
- Season summary map

Seasonal boundaries
- First system formed: June 23, 2025
- Last system dissipated: October 31, 2025

Strongest storm
- Name: Melissa (Tied for strongest Atlantic hurricane by maximum sustained winds, third-most intense by central pressure on record)
  - Maximum winds: 190 mph (305 km/h) (1-minute sustained)
  - Lowest pressure: 892 mbar (hPa; 26.34 inHg)

Seasonal statistics
- Total depressions: 13
- Total storms: 13
- Hurricanes: 5
- Major hurricanes (Cat. 3+): 4
- ACE: 130.8
- Total fatalities: 126 total
- Total damage: > $12.7 billion (2025 USD)

Related articles
- Timeline of the 2025 Atlantic hurricane season; 2025 Pacific hurricane season; 2025 Pacific typhoon season; 2025 North Indian Ocean cyclone season

The 2025 Atlantic hurricane season was an unusual Atlantic hurricane season that featured bursts of intense tropical cyclone development over warmer-than-normal waters between long and quiet stretches with low tropical activity. Three Category 5 hurricanes formed this season, the second most of any year on record, behind only the 2005 season, which had four. Among the three was Hurricane Melissa, the strongest tropical cyclone of the year globally, among the most intense Atlantic hurricanes on record, as well as the strongest tropical cyclone to make landfall in Jamaica on record. Due in large part to these systems, and despite a near-average total of 13 named storms, 5 hurricanes and 4 major hurricanes, the season had an above-normal accumulated cyclone energy (ACE) rating of 130.8 units. The season officially began on June 1, and ended on November 30. These dates, adopted by convention, historically describe the period in each year when most subtropical or tropical cyclogenesis occurs in the Atlantic Ocean. Overall, 13 named storms formed, with 5 of those becoming hurricanes, of which 4 strengthened into major hurricanes (Category 3 or higher on the Saffir–Simpson scale). The first system, Tropical Storm Andrea, formed on June 23, marking the latest start to an Atlantic season since 2014.

Also in June, Tropical Storm Barry struck Veracruz causing widespread flooding in eastern Mexico. Then, in July, Tropical Storm Chantal hit South Carolina, the only system to make landfall in the United States this season, producing heavy rainfall across the Carolinas. No hurricanes made landfall in the United States this season, for the first time since 2015. In August, Hurricane Erin reached Category 5 strength. It made landfall in Cape Verde as a tropical storm and had indirect effects on the eastern Caribbean and the Atlantic coast of the United States. Afterwards, unfavorable conditions caused tropical cyclogenesis to cease for nearly a month through the end of August and the first two weeks of September, during the typical peak of the hurricane season. In mid-September, activity resumed with the formation of Hurricane Gabrielle in the central Atlantic. Gabrielle rapidly intensified into a Category 4 hurricane before weakening and affecting the Azores and Spain as an extratropical cyclone. Next came Hurricanes Humberto and Imelda. Humberto attained Category 5 strength, but did not make landfall. While developing into a tropical cyclone, Imelda caused significant flooding in the Eastern Caribbean before strengthening off the East Coast of the United States and passing close to Bermuda. In October, Tropical Storm Jerry brought heavy rain to portions of the Lesser Antilles. Later that month, the final and strongest storm of the season, Hurricane Melissa, intensified into a Category 5 hurricane south of Jamaica and made landfall there near peak intensity, resulting in catastrophic destruction. Melissa dissipated on October 31, with no storms forming during the month of November, in turn concluding the season. Collectively, the storms during the season caused at least 126 fatalities and resulted in at least US$12.7 billion in monetary losses, mostly due to Melissa.

== Seasonal forecasts ==
Predictions of tropical activity in the 2025 season
Source	Date	Named storms	Hurricanes	Major hurricanes	Ref
Average (1991–2020)		14.4	7.2	3.2
Record high activity		30	15	7†
Record low activity		1	0†	0†
TSR	December 10, 2024	15	7	3
CSU	April 3, 2025	17	9	4
TSR	April 7, 2025	14	7	3
UA	April 9, 2025	15	7	3
MU	April 14, 2025	12–16	7–9	3–4
NCSU	April 15, 2025	12–15	6–8	2–3
TWC	April 17, 2025	19	9	4
UPenn	April 23, 2025	10–18	N/A	N/A
SMN	May 7, 2025	13–17	6–8	3–4
UKMO	May 21, 2025	16	9	4
NOAA	May 22, 2025	13–19	6–10	3–5
TSR	May 23, 2025	16	8	4
CSU	June 11, 2025	17	9	4
UA	June 17, 2025	17	7	3
TSR	July 8, 2025	15	7	3
CSU	July 9, 2025	16	8	3
NOAA	August 7, 2025	13–18	5–9	2–5
	Actual activity	13	5	4
† Most recent of several such occurrences. (See all)

In advance of, and during, each hurricane season, several forecasts of hurricane activity are issued by national meteorological services, scientific agencies, and noted hurricane experts. These include forecasters from the United States National Oceanic and Atmospheric Administration (NOAA)'s Climate Prediction Center, Tropical Storm Risk (TSR), the United Kingdom's Met Office, and Colorado State University (CSU). The forecasts include weekly and monthly changes in significant factors that help determine the number of tropical storms, hurricanes, and major hurricanes within a particular season.

According to NOAA and CSU, the average hurricane season between 1991 and 2020 contained about 14 named storms, 7 hurricanes, and 3 major hurricanes (Category 3 and higher), as well as an accumulated cyclone energy (ACE) index of 72–111 units. Broadly speaking, ACE is the measure of the power of a tropical or subtropical cyclone multiplied by the length of time it existed. ACE is only calculated for full advisories on specific tropical or subtropical cyclones reaching wind speeds of 39 mph (63 km/h) or higher. NOAA typically describes a season as above-average, average, or below-average depending on the cumulative ACE index, but the number of tropical storms, hurricanes or major hurricanes can also be considered.

=== Pre-season forecasts ===
On December 10, 2024, Tropical Storm Risk (TSR) released its extended range forecast for the 2025 season, predicting an average season with 15 named storms, 7 hurricanes, and 3 major hurricanes, (Note: Hurricanes reaching Category 3 and higher—1-minute sustained winds higher than 110 miles per hour (178 km/h)—on the Saffir–Simpson scale are described as major hurricanes.) and an ACE index of 129, but noted that the forecast had higher than normal uncertainty due to environmental factors.

On April 3, 2025, Colorado State University (CSU) released its forecast, which predicts an above-average hurricane season with 17 named storms, 9 hurricanes, and 4 major hurricanes, with an ACE index of 155, citing extremely warm Atlantic sea surface temperatures and a weakening La Niña transitioning to a neutral phase by summer. Four days later, TSR issued an updated forecast, again calling for a near-average season reducing the number of tropical storms to 14, but maintained the numbers of hurricanes at 7 and majors at 3 and ACE index of 120.

On April 9, the University of Arizona (UA) posted their forecast calling for a fairly normal season featuring 15 named storms, 7 hurricanes, 3 major hurricanes, and an ACE index of 110 units. On April 14, University of Missouri (MU) issued their prediction of 12–16 named storms, 7–9 hurricanes, and 3–4 major hurricanes. On April 15, North Carolina State University (NCSU) predicted a season with 12–15 tropical storms, 6–8 hurricanes, and 2–3 major hurricanes. On April 17, The Weather Company (TWC) released their outlook anticipating a well above average season with 19 named systems, 9 hurricanes and 4 major hurricanes. On April 23, the University of Pennsylvania (UPenn) issued their forecast of 10–18 named storms with a best guess of 14 storms.

On May 7, the Servicio Meteorológico Nacional (SMN) issued their forecast of 13–17 tropical storms, 6–8 hurricanes, and 3–4 major hurricanes. On May 21, the Met Office (UKMO) released their prediction of 16 tropical storms, 9 hurricanes, and 4 major hurricanes as well as ACE Index of 154. On May 22, the National Oceanic and Atmospheric Administration (NOAA) released their forecast, calling for an above-average season, expecting 13–19 named storms, 6–10 hurricanes, and 3–5 major hurricanes as well as an ACE index of 95–180. On May 23, 2025, TSR updated its forecast, calling for an above-average season, expecting 16 named storms, 8 hurricanes, and 4 major hurricanes and an ACE index of 146.

=== Mid-season forecasts ===
On June 11, CSU updated its prediction, continuing to show an above average season, with 17 named storms, 9 hurricanes, 4 major hurricanes, and an ACE index of 155, the same statistics forecasted in April. On June 17, the University of Arizona (UA) updated their forecast, continuing to call for a season featuring 17 named storms, 7 hurricanes, and 3 major hurricanes, but an above-normal ACE index of 155 units—higher than predicted in April.

On July 8, TSR updated their forecast, calling for 15 named storms, 7 hurricanes, 3 major hurricanes, an ACE index of 126 units, with CSU updating their predictions the next day, slightly downgrading their forecast to 16 named storms, 8 hurricanes, 3 major hurricanes, and an ACE index of 140 units. Weeks later, on August 7, NOAA updated its predictions as well, continuing to forecast an above-average season, but slightly decreasing their forecasted totals of storms. NOAA's predictions were reduced to 13–18 named storms, 5–9 hurricanes, and 2–5 major hurricanes.

== Seasonal summary ==
=== Background ===
The 2025 Atlantic hurricane season per the NHC outlooks.

The 2025 Atlantic hurricane season officially began on June 1, and ended on November 30. Thirteen tropical cyclones formed, all of which intensified into named storms. Five storms strengthened into hurricanes, four of which became major hurricanes, the highest percentage ever observed in an Atlantic hurricane season. In a post-season review by the NHC, they estimated that the individual strength of this season's storms was 50% harder to predict on average.

This season's ACE index was approximately 130.8 units, as officially calculated by the NHC. This number represents the sum of the squares of the maximum sustained wind speeds (measured in knots) for all named storms while they are at least tropical storm intensity, divided by 10,000.

=== Early-season activity ===
Tropical cyclogenesis in the Atlantic Ocean began on June 23 with the formation of Tropical Storm Andrea, three weeks after the official start of the season and three days later than the basin's average first named storm date. This marked the latest start to an Atlantic hurricane season since 2014, when Hurricane Arthur developed on July 1. Andrea remained over open waters in the central Atlantic. The second storm, Tropical Storm Barry, formed in the Bay of Campeche on June 28 and made landfall near Tampico the following day.

Early-season storm formation was limited by several factors. A sprawling North Atlantic High steered tropical waves emerging from West Africa farther south than usual, toward Central America and into the eastern Pacific Ocean. Persistent Saharan dust and the interaction of Kelvin and Rossby waves over the Americas contributed to a hostile environment for tropical development. The third storm, Tropical Storm Chantal, developed off the Atlantic coast of the Southeastern United States on July 4 and made landfall two days later in South Carolina. All three early-season storms were short-lived, lasting a combined 2.5 days as named storms, well below the 1991–2020 average of 9.1 days through August 2.

=== Peak-season activity ===
A satellite loop of Hurricanes Humberto (right) and Imelda (center) coming close to each other

After nearly a month of inactivity, Tropical Storm Dexter developed along a stalled front off the North Carolina coast on August 3 before moving out to sea. Hurricane Erin formed near Cape Verde on August 11 and traversed the Atlantic, intensifying into a Category 5 hurricane near the northern Leeward Islands on August 16. It then brought rain, wind, and rip currents to Puerto Rico, Turks and Caicos, the Bahamas, and the East Coast of the United States, while remaining off shore.

Shortly after Erin became extratropical, Tropical Storm Fernand formed in the open Atlantic, southeast of Bermuda. Wind shear along with dry air and stable atmospheric conditions inhibited tropical cyclogenesis during the first half of September, the climatological peak of hurricane season. (Note: September 10 is the climatological mid-point of the Atlantic hurricane season.) This highly unusual, nearly three-week long inactive stretch came to an end with the formation of Hurricane Gabrielle on September 17, far to the east of the northern Leeward Islands. The only other season in the weather satellite era to have no named storm active between the end of August and mid-September was the 1992 season. Gabrielle approached Bermuda as a Category 4 hurricane, completed a right turn just southeast of the island, then moved toward the Azores.

On September 24, Hurricane Humberto formed in the central Atlantic. It ultimately became the second Category 5 hurricane of the season. To its west, Hurricane Imelda formed on September 27. On September 30, the centers of these two systems came within 465 mi (750 km) of each other, closer together than any other two storms in the Atlantic in the satellite era.

=== Late-season activity ===
On October 7, Tropical Storm Jerry formed in the tropical Atlantic, bringing heavy winds and rains to the Leeward Islands; then came short-lived Subtropical Storm Karen on October 10. Karen formed at 44.5°N, farther north than any other subtropical or tropical cyclone in the NHC database. Next, on October 13, Tropical Storm Lorenzo formed in the open Eastern Atlantic. Later, on October 21, Hurricane Melissa formed in the Caribbean Sea. It became the third Category 5 hurricane of the season, and the strongest Atlantic hurricane by maximum sustained winds, tying Hurricane Allen from the 1980 season. These three Category 5 systems are the second-most of any season after 2005, the only other season to have more than two Category 5 hurricanes.

== Systems ==
=== Tropical Storm Andrea ===
- Tropical storm (SSHWS)
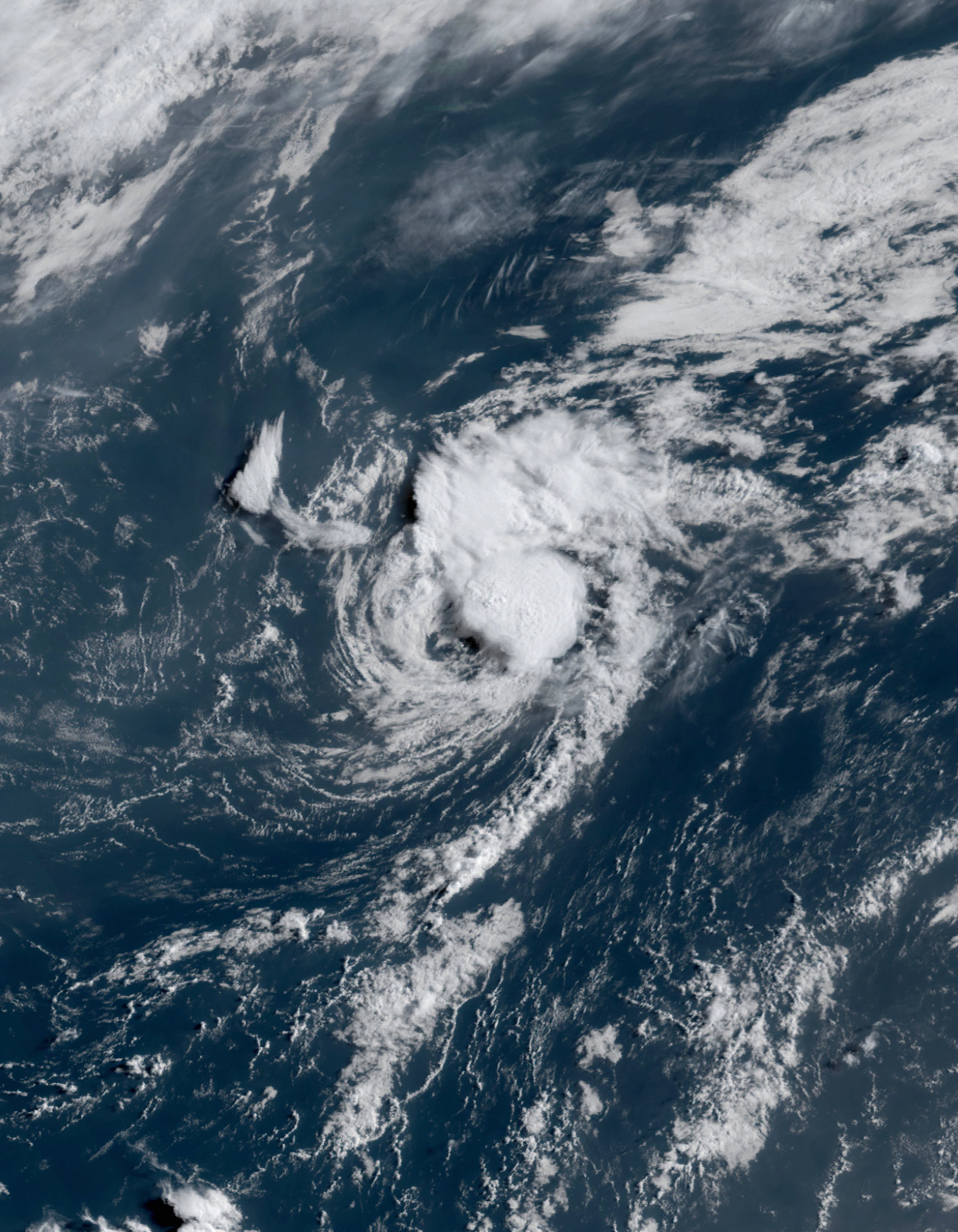
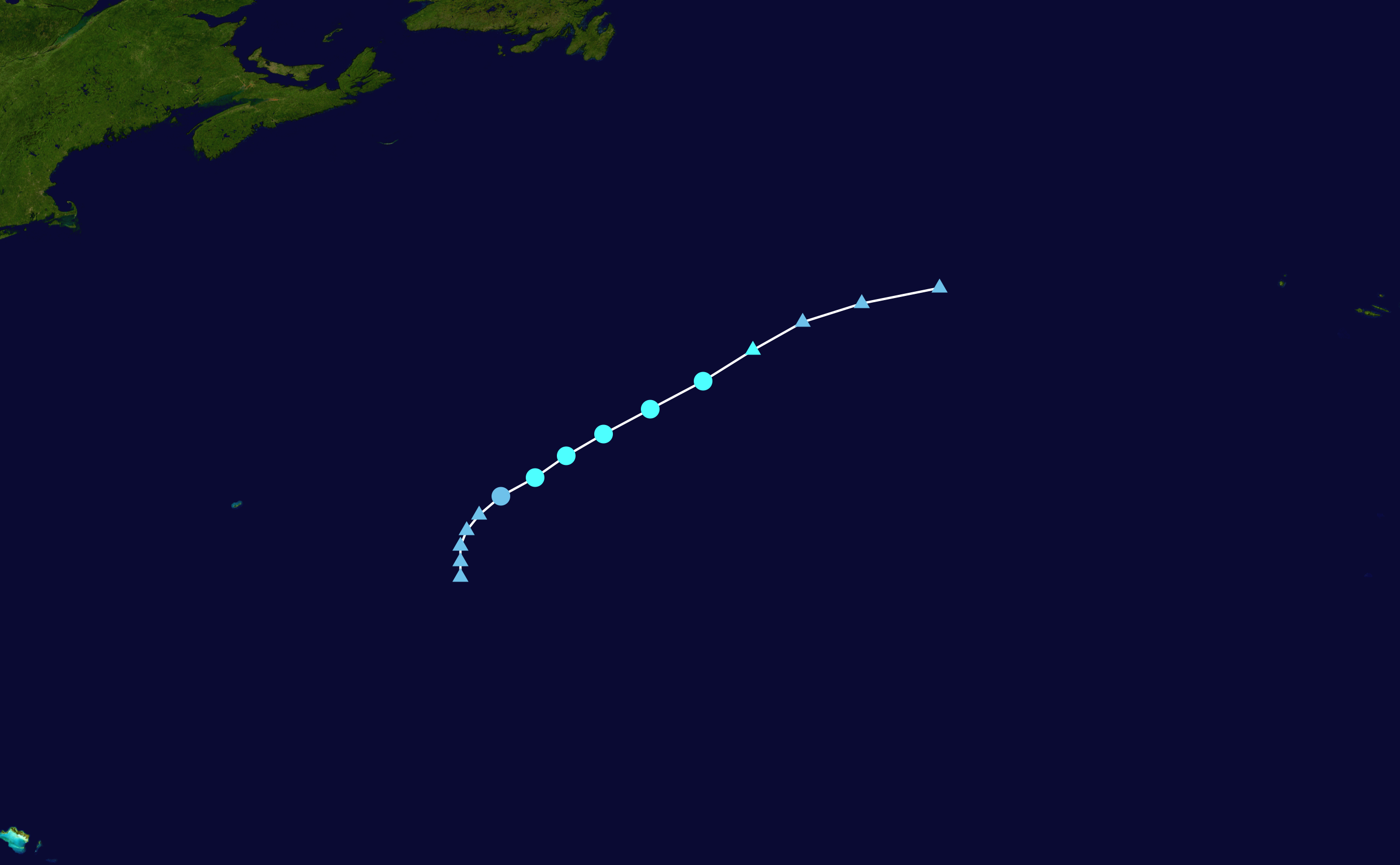
- Duration: June 23 – June 24
- Peak intensity: 40 mph (65 km/h) (1-min); 1014 mbar (hPa)

On June 22, an area of low pressure developed east-southeast of Bermuda, along a decaying stationary front. Deep convection and organization increased, with a tropical depression forming at 06:00 UTC on June 23, about 490 mi (790 km) east of Bermuda. Andrea reached peak intensity of 40 mph (65 km/h) six hours later. Andrea existed in a high-pressure environment, leading to it having an above average central pressure, estimated through the Knaff-Zehr-Courtney relationship at 1014 mbar (29.9 inHg). Deep convection collapsed by 15:00 UTC on June 24. Three hours later, Andrea degenerated into an extratropical low roughly 700 mi (1,125 km) southeast of Cape Race, Newfoundland, and completely dissipated by the next day, at 18:00 UTC on June 25.

=== Tropical Storm Barry ===
- Tropical storm (SSHWS)
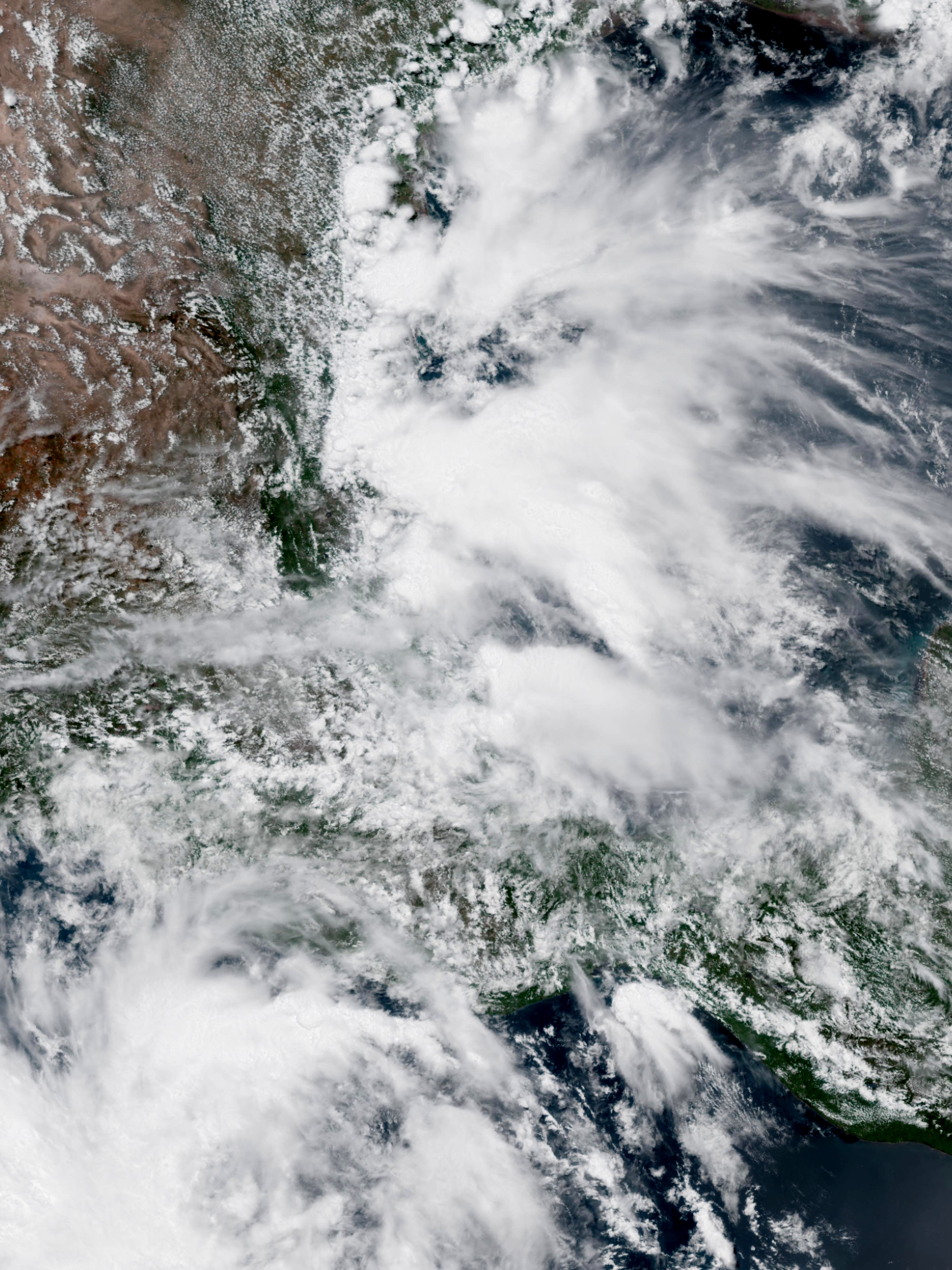
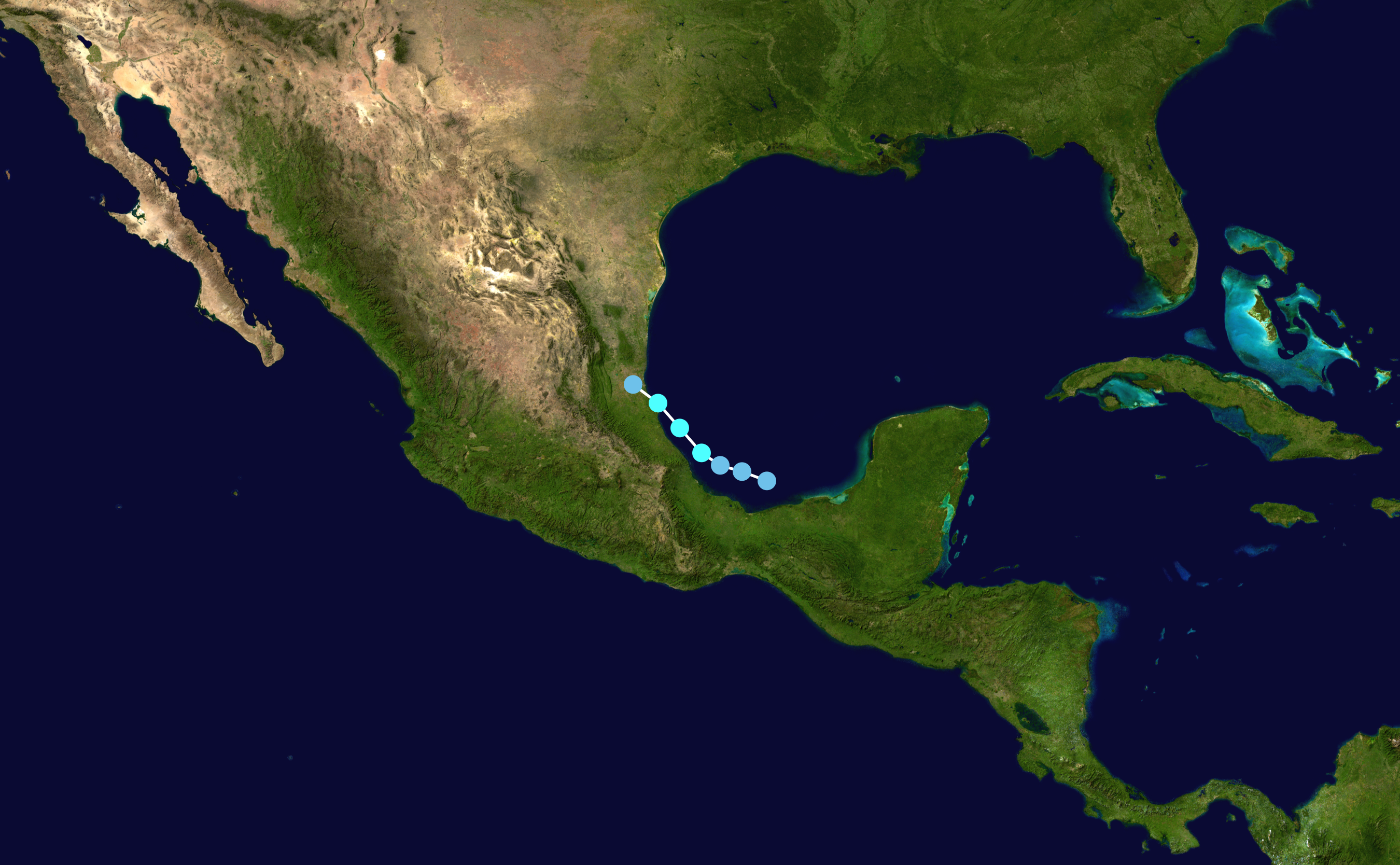
- Duration: June 28 – June 30
- Peak intensity: 45 mph (75 km/h) (1-min); 1006 mbar (hPa)

On June 28, a broad area of low pressure formed over the Yucatán Peninsula in association with a tropical wave. As the disturbance emerged into the Bay of Campeche, a well-defined surface circulation and deep convection began developing. This trend continued, resulting in the formation of Tropical Depression Two that afternoon. The system became Tropical Storm Barry on the morning of June 29, about 90 mi (145 km) east-southeast of Tuxpan, Veracruz, and soon peaked with winds of 45 mph (75 km/h) and minimum pressure of 1,006 mbar (29.7 inHg). The storm moved northwestward, steered by a stationary low-to-mid level ridge in the central Gulf. Its intensity increased little during this time, due to wind shear. Early on June 30, Barry weakened to a tropical depression and made landfall south of Tampico, Tamaulipas, with sustained winds of 35 mph (55 km/h). Inland, Barry's low-level circulation soon dissipated over the mountains of northeastern Mexico.

The tropical wave that spawned Barry caused flooding and damage in Quintana Roo. Water levels reached from 16 to 39 in (40 to 100 cm) in some areas, while a maximum of 16.9 in (428 mm) of rain fell. In neighboring Chiapas, heavy rains triggered landslides, leaving communication links to several communities cut off. Heavy rain was also reported in Belize, where severe damage was reported to infrastructure with numerous buildings collapsing in rural communities. Flooding affected more than 20 communities as water levels rose at least 20 in (500 mm). In Veracruz, Veracruz, two people drowned after rough surf swept them out to sea in their car. Two young people drowned in Santa María del Río, San Luis Potosí, when the motorcycle on which they were riding was swept away by the current of a flooded river. Additionally, one person in Matamoros, Tamaulipas, drowned after his car was swept away by an overflowing sewage canal. Throughout Mexico, Barry caused more than US$5.64 million in damage. In West Texas, the remnant low of Barry caused flooding and minor property damage in two counties totaling US$225,000.

=== Tropical Storm Chantal ===
- Tropical storm (SSHWS)
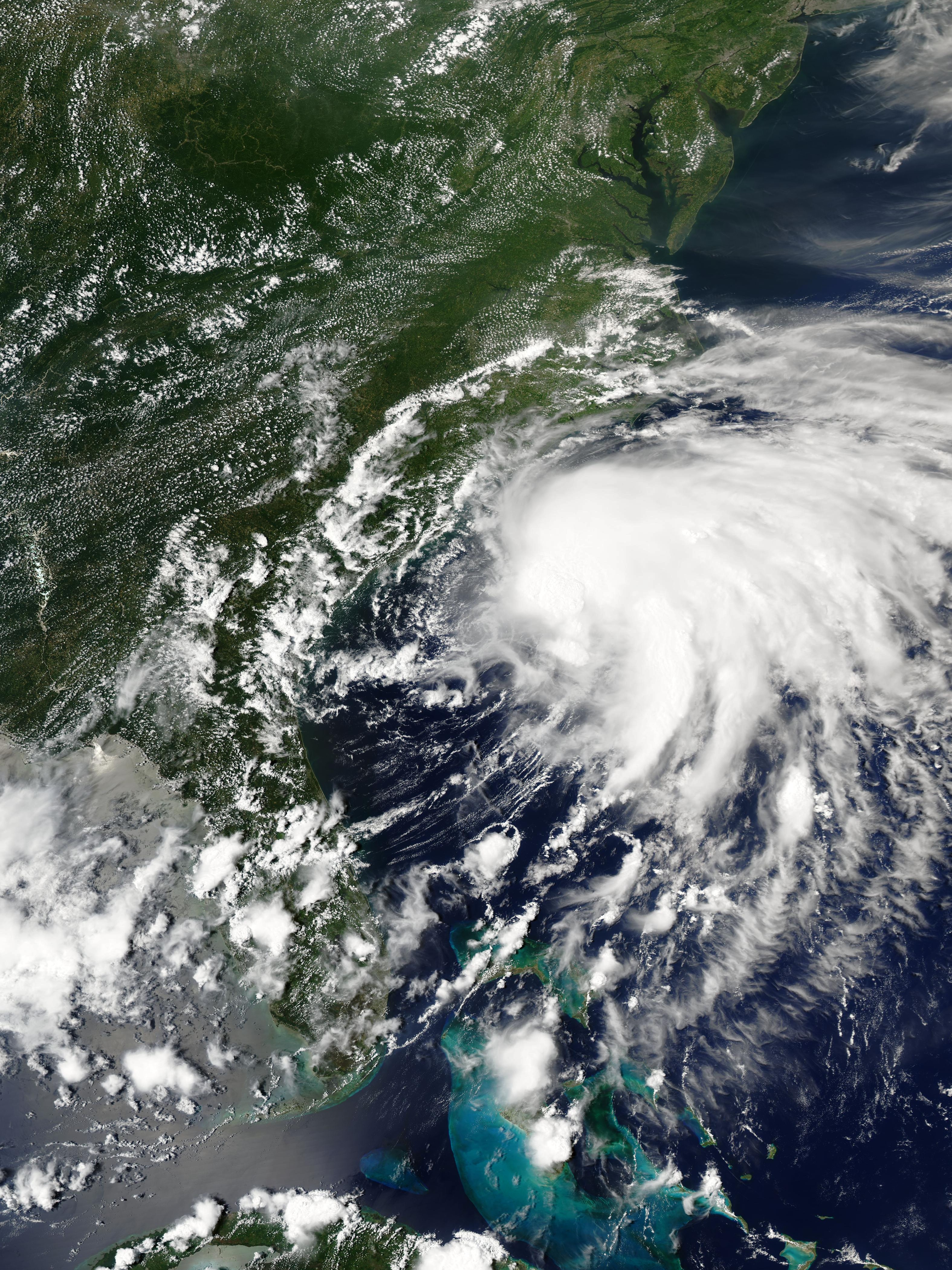
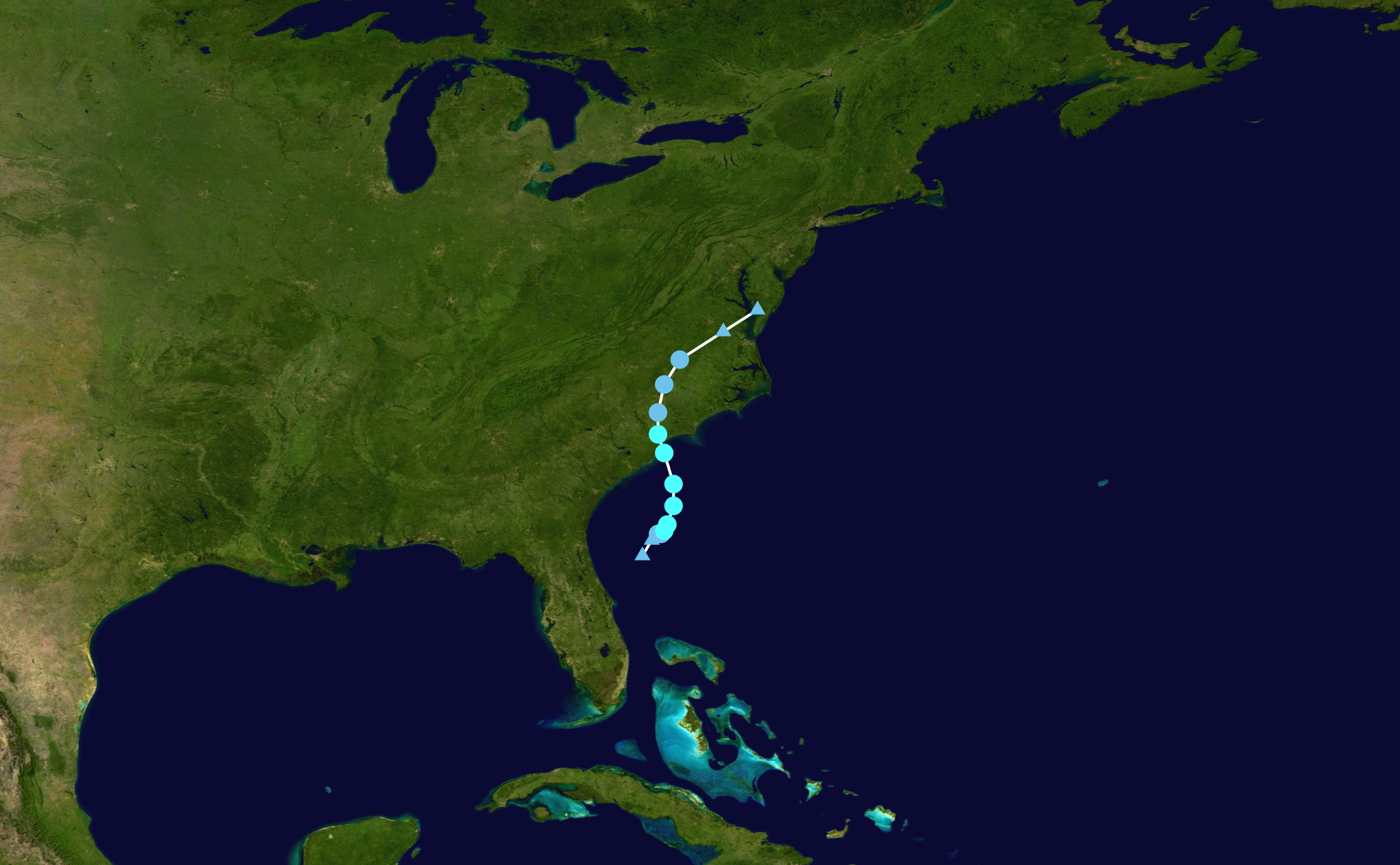
- Duration: July 4 – July 7
- Peak intensity: 60 mph (95 km/h) (1-min); 1002 mbar (hPa)

On June 29, the NHC began monitoring a decaying frontal boundary along the southeastern United States coastline for potential tropical development. Early on July 4, a weak area of low pressure developed along the boundary, off the coast of northeastern Florida. Wind shear in the region was weak at the time, and sea surface temperatures were seasonably warm, around 82 to 84 °F (28 to 29 °C). At 18:00 UTC that day, the circulation associated with the low became well-defined and was designated Tropical Depression Three by the NHC. The system became better organized overnight, showing a significant burst of deep convection on GOES-19 infrared imagery, and strengthened into Tropical Storm Chantal at 06:00 UTC on July 5. That afternoon, the storm maintained a concentrated area of deep convection over the eastern half of its dense cloud cover, while moving northward off the coast of the Carolinas against moderate wind shear. Early on July 6, Chantal briefly intensified to 60 mph (95 km/h), and slightly turned north-northwestward, before making landfall near Litchfield Beach, South Carolina, at approximately 08:00 UTC. The storm moved northward inland, weakening to a tropical depression strength by late morning. A day later, Chantal transitioned to a post-tropical cyclone over northern Virginia.

In Florida, the precursor to Chantal prompted the cancellation of several Fourth of July events due to rain. As Chantal moved ashore in South Carolina, highest reported wind gust reached 56 mph (90 km/h) in Myrtle Beach. In North Carolina, maximum totals of 7–8 in (180–200 mm) of rain fell. Flooding and power outages were reported. In Orange County, a state of emergency was declared due to flash flooding. Over 50 water rescues were conducted across the county. An EF1 tornado damaged two airplanes and two hangars at Raleigh Executive Jetport. In Durham County, North Carolina, rescue crews performed over eighty rescue missions by boat; the Eno River rose 22 feet (6.7 m) within a four hour-period. The Haw River rose to 32.5 feet (9.91 meters), the second-highest river stage ever recorded. In North Carolina, four people were found deceased in cars as a result of flooding, two in Alamance County, one in Chatham County, and one in Orange County. Additionally, two boaters were found dead after going missing while boating on Jordan Lake. In all, six people have been confirmed dead in the state. Losses totaled to US$500 million according to Gallagher Re.

=== Tropical Storm Dexter ===
- Tropical storm (SSHWS)
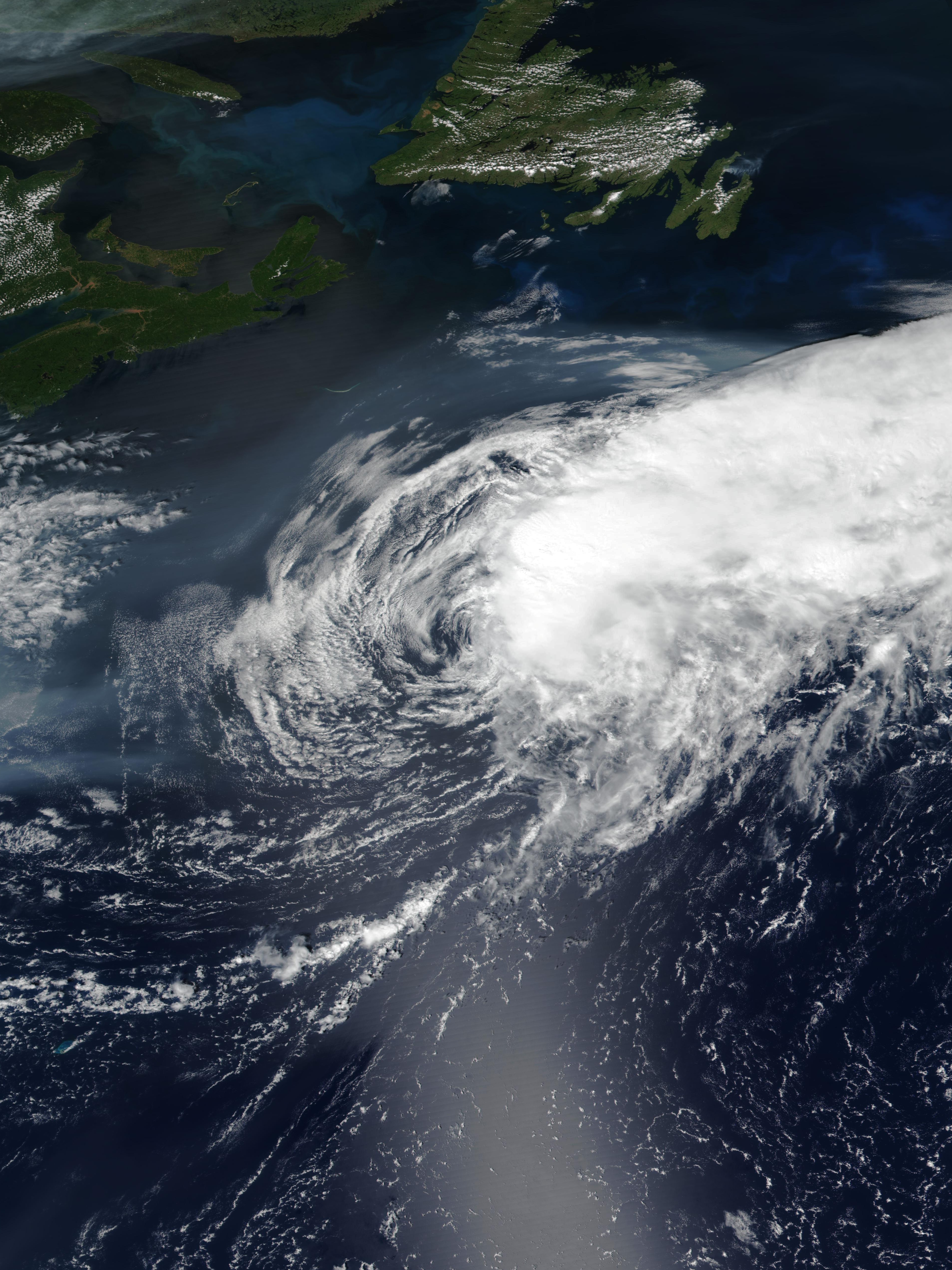
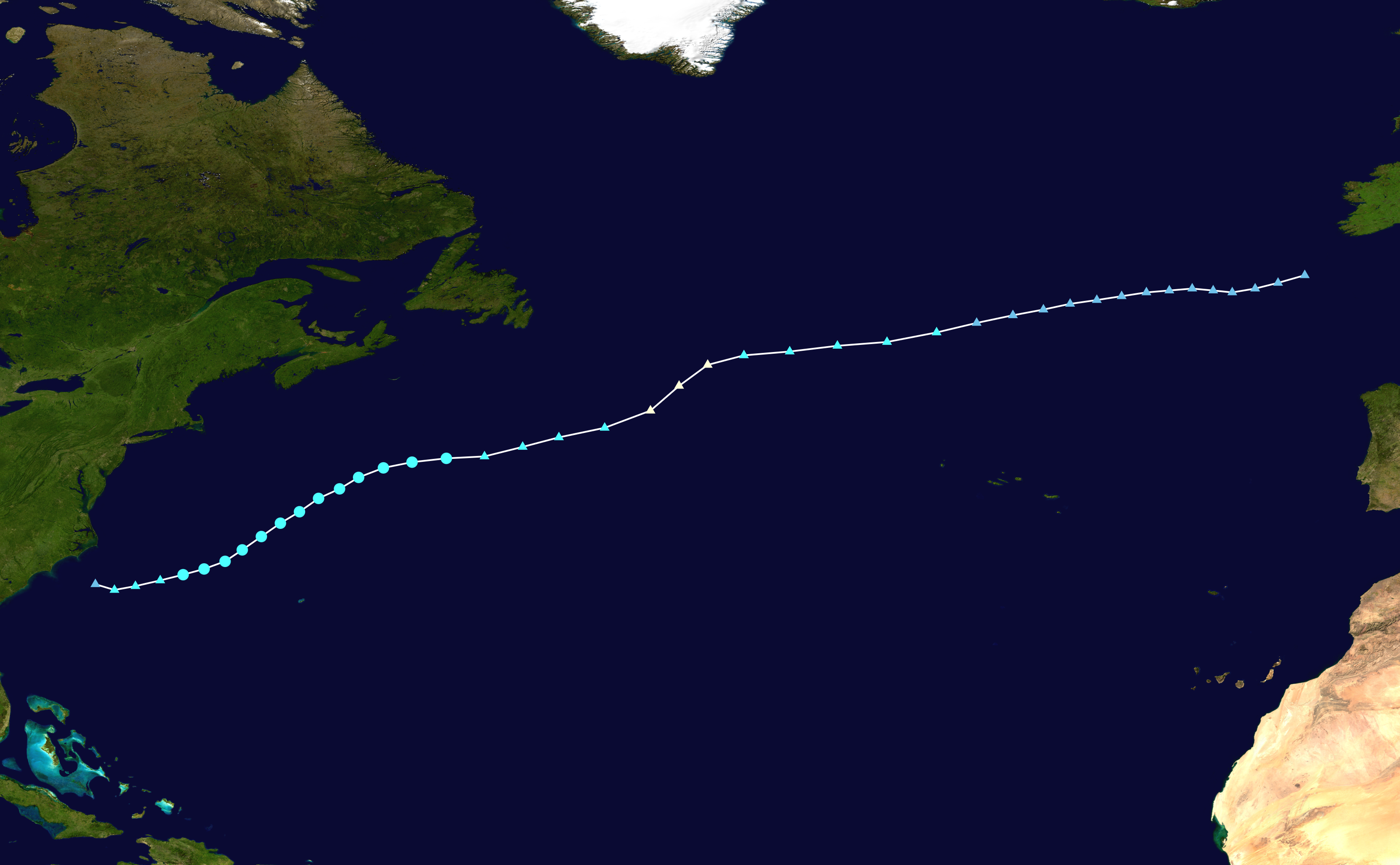
- Duration: August 3 – August 6
- Peak intensity: 60 mph (95 km/h) (1-min); 999 mbar (hPa)

On August 2, a non-tropical area of low pressure with a well-defined circulation formed off the coast of North Carolina from a stationary front. The attached front began degrading to the west-southwest and the low developed gale-force winds in the morning of August 3. By the afternoon, its associated shower and thunderstorm activity was increasing and the front to the east-northeast began to degrade. By 18:00 UTC that same day, the front was shed and the low became Tropical Storm Dexter. After formation, additional strengthening was, for a time, stifled by strong westerly wind shear, and the storm appeared to be weakening the next morning. Despite the shear, which increased to 40–45 mph (65–75 km/h) by the morning of August 6, Dexter continued to display convection, and managed to strengthen to 60 mph (95 km/h) due to the influence of an upper-level trough. Dexter completed its extratropical transition the following day, upon merging with a mid- to upper-level trough. After completing its extratropical transition, Dexter's remnant further intensified into a powerful, hurricane-force extratropical low on August 8 as baroclinic processes continued to strengthen the cyclone. As the following days passed, post-tropical Dexter weakened substantially, ultimately dissipating more than a hundred miles southwest of Ireland on August 13.

=== Hurricane Erin ===
- Category 5 hurricane (SSHWS)
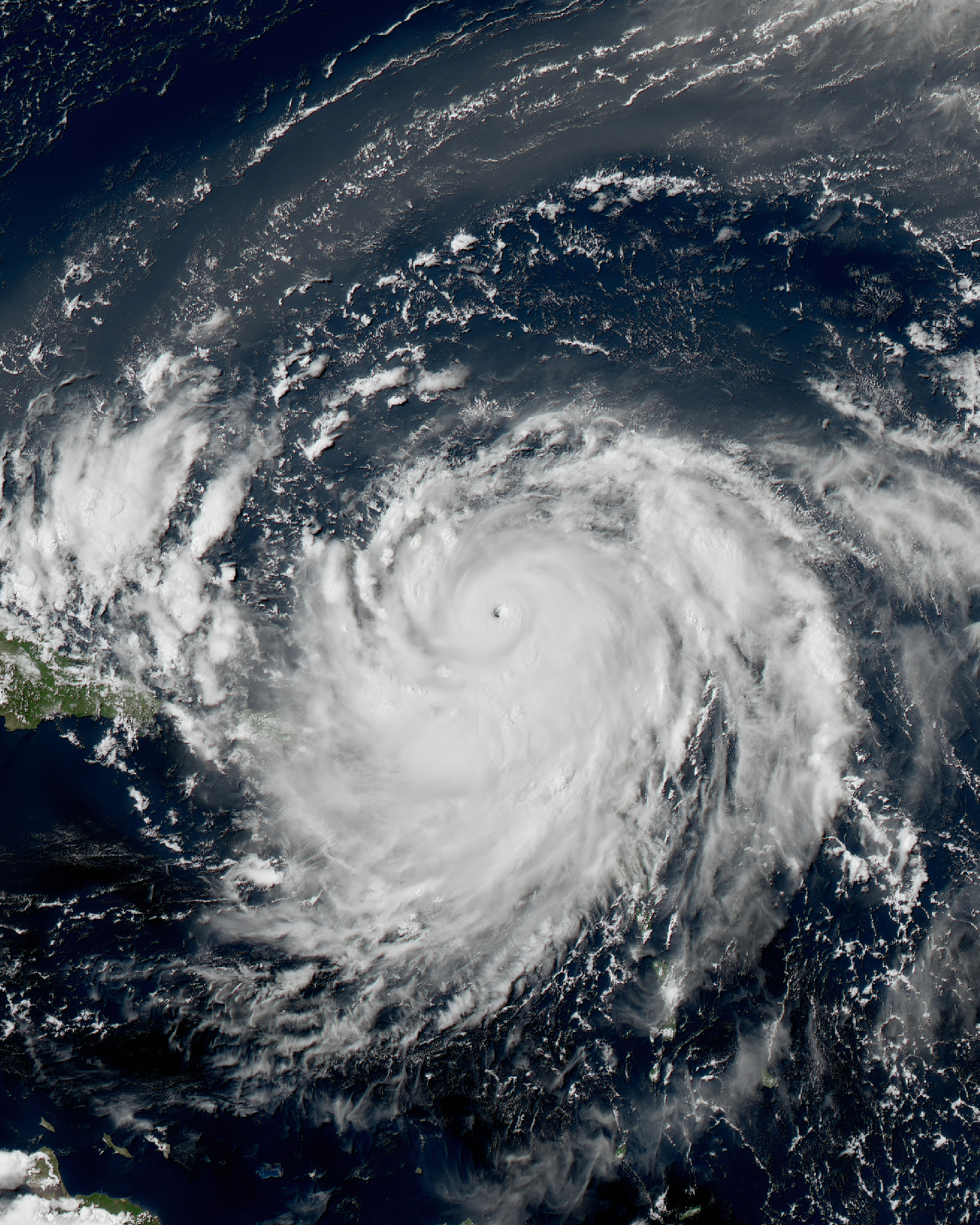
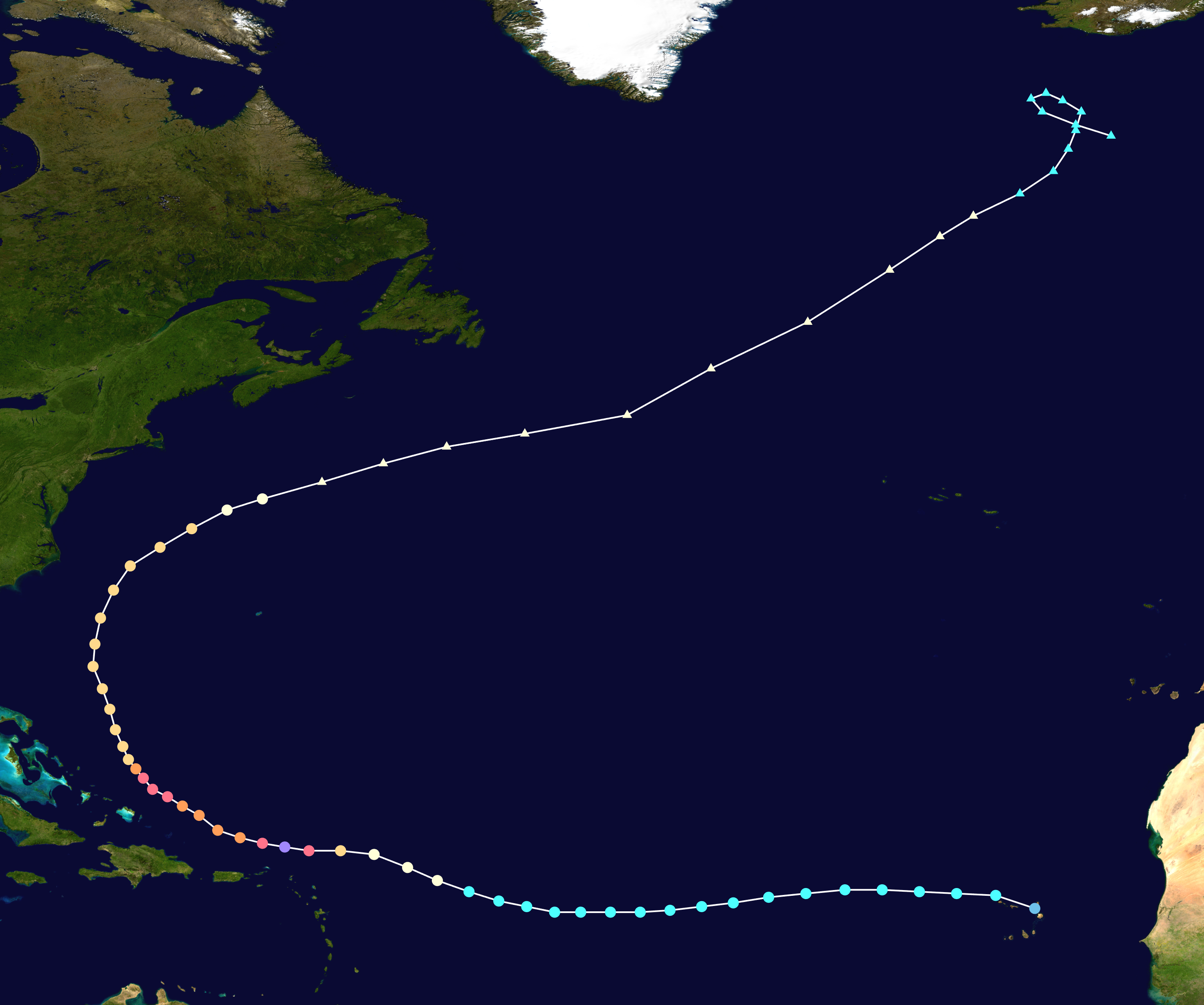
- Duration: August 11 – August 22
- Peak intensity: 160 mph (260 km/h) (1-min); 913 mbar (hPa)

On August 8, a tropical wave moved off the west coast of Africa. The disturbance organized while moving slowly westward to northwestward and developed into a tropical depression near Sal in the Cabo Verde Islands early on August 11. Six hours later, the depression intensified into Tropical Storm Erin as it struck Santo Antão, although relatively dry air and marginally warm seas led to little additional strengthening for the next few days. Erin attained hurricane strength at 12:00 UTC on August 15, and its structure improved dramatically throughout the day. On August 16, while moving west-northwestward, Erin rapidly intensified into a Category 4 hurricane at 12:00 UTC and a Category 5 by six hours later, based on data from Air Force Hurricane Hunters. The storm peaked with winds of 160 mph (260 km/h) and a minimum pressure of 913 mbar (26.96 inHg), about 135 mi (220 km) northwest of the British Virgin Islands. However, the storm weakened to Category 3 status early on August 17 due to an eyewall replacement cycle. After the cycle was completed, Erin reintensified to Category 4 early the following day, with a wider eye, and an expanding wind field. Late that same day, the system weakened again to Category 3, as it tracked northwestward, east of the Bahamas. Erin, now at Category 2 strength, turned to the east-northeast early on August 21. At 06:00 UTC that day, it passed about 200 mi (320 km) southeast of North Carolina. The hurricane weakened to Category 1 strength due increasing wind shear and falling sea surface temperatures on August 22, several hours before becoming extratropical about 320 mi (515 km) south of Sable Island, Nova Scotia. The extratropical cyclone continued northeastward until making a loop near Iceland, where it merged with another extratropical low on August 27.

In Cabo Verde, there were nine flooding-related deaths on São Vicente. Between 00:00 to 05:00 local time on August 11, the island recorded 7.57 in (192.3 mm) of rainfall. On account of widespread property and infrastructure damage from the storm, the Cabo Verde government issued a disaster declaration for São Vicente and Santo Antão. Five people were reported missing and 1,500 people were displaced. Rough seas and storms impacted much of the northern Caribbean. One man drowned in the Dominican Republic due to dangerous swimming conditions. Erin would go on to impact the East Coast of the United States in a similar way. Tide gauges at Duck, North Carolina, Virginia Beach, Virginia, and Kiptopeke, Virginia, recorded major flooding late on August 21, around high tide. Minor to moderate coastal flooding was reported in nine other states, from Maryland north to Maine. Despite being far from the storm, Tennessee saw some effects. Upper level winds from Erin steered the remnants of a Mesoscale convective system into the state. A car crashed into a downed tree, killing the driver. Damage in North Carolina totaled to US$3.1 million. Damage in the United States totaled to US$25 million.

=== Tropical Storm Fernand ===
- Tropical storm (SSHWS)
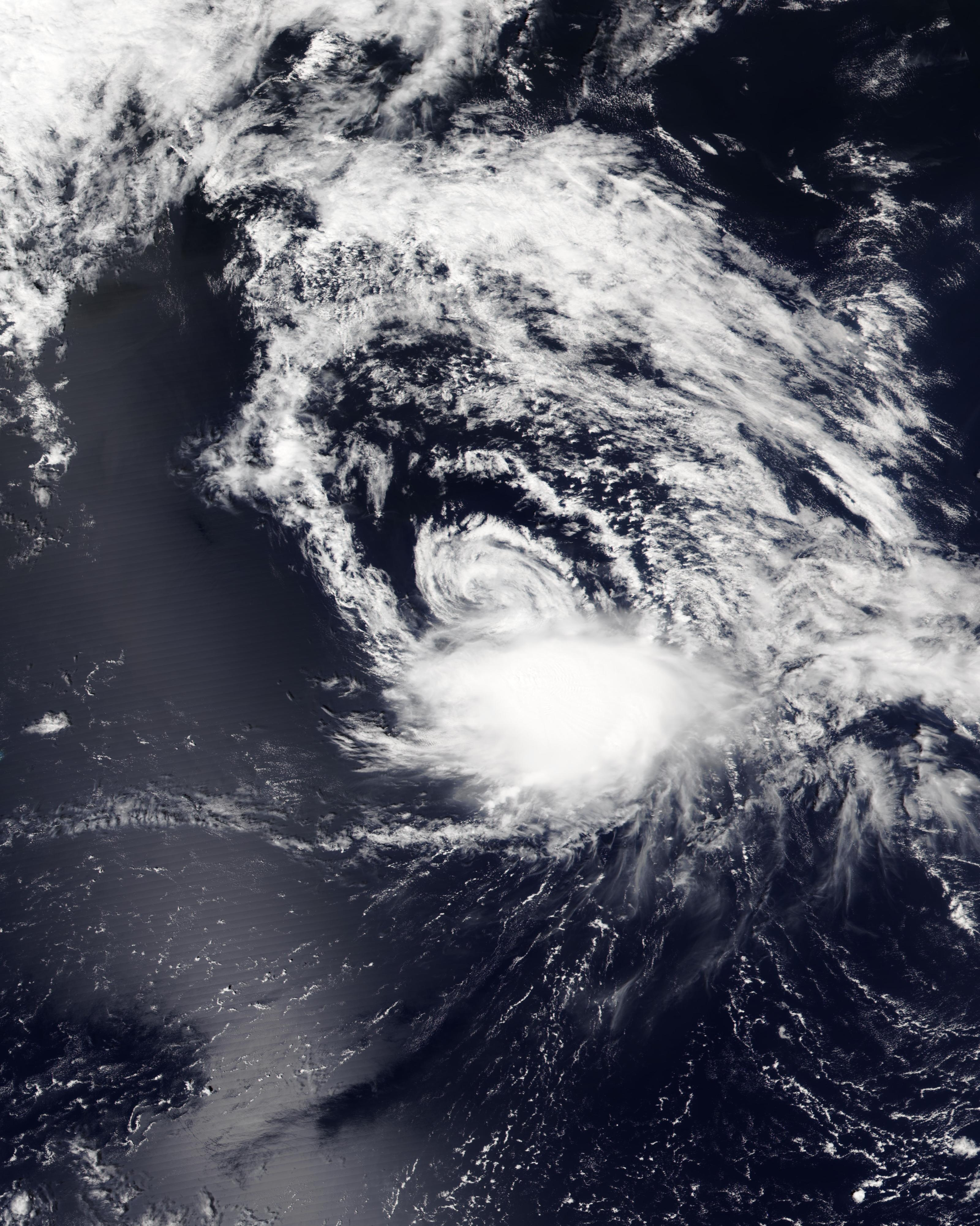
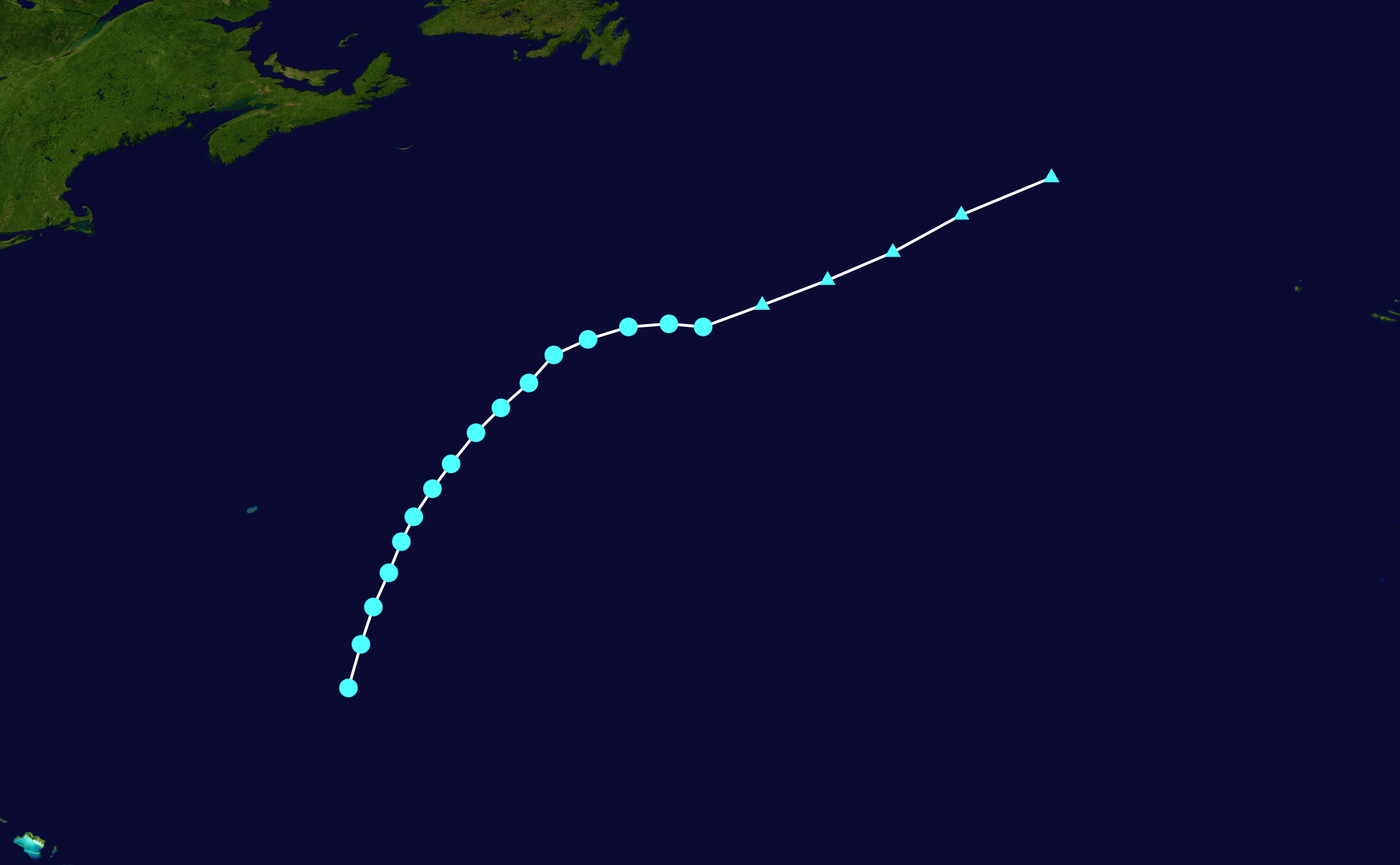
- Duration: August 23 – August 27
- Peak intensity: 60 mph (95 km/h) (1-min); 999 mbar (hPa)

From August 14 to August 15, a tropical wave moved off of the west coast of Africa. The wave progressed westward for a week across the Atlantic. The shower and thunderstorm activity within the low began to show some signs of organization on August 22, as the disturbance tracked near the northern Leeward Islands. The northern portion of the wave began moving north. The disturbance was moving northwestward, amid very warm 82–84 °F (28–29 °C) waters, toward a steering flow weakness created earlier by Hurricane Erin. Then, on the afternoon of August 23, the disturbance organized into Tropical Storm Fernand. Fernand tracked north-northeastward the following day, and began to strengthen. At 12:00 UTC on August 25, Fernand reached a peak intensity of 60 miles per hour (97 km/h) and a minimum pressure of 999 millibars, based on measurements from ASCAT and the Knaff-Zehr-Courtney wind-pressure relationship, respectively. Later that day, the storm's structure deteriorated and winds decreased due to northerly wind shear. It also moved over a cooler eddy in the Gulf Stream early on August 26, resulting in the loss of all deep convection near its center; though it reignited that afternoon, resulting in some slight re-strengthening. Fernand maintained maximum surface winds of around 50 mph (85 km/h) over the southern part of the circulation into August 27, though, by the end of the day, the system was producing only minimal shower activity, with little convection, and degenerated into a post-tropical cyclone the following morning. Fernand's remnants were ultimately absorbed by a developing extratropical system.

=== Hurricane Gabrielle ===
- Category 4 hurricane (SSHWS)
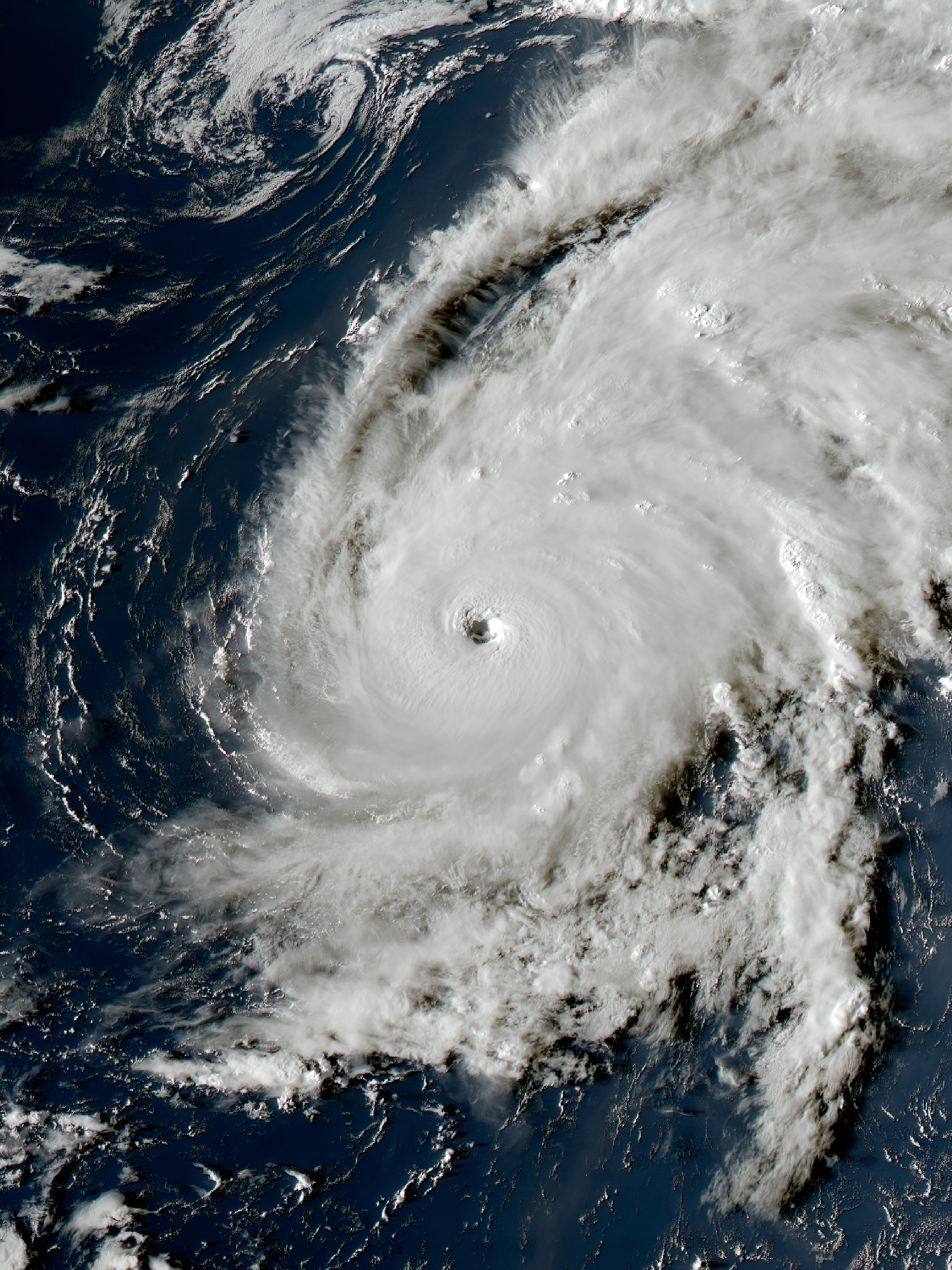
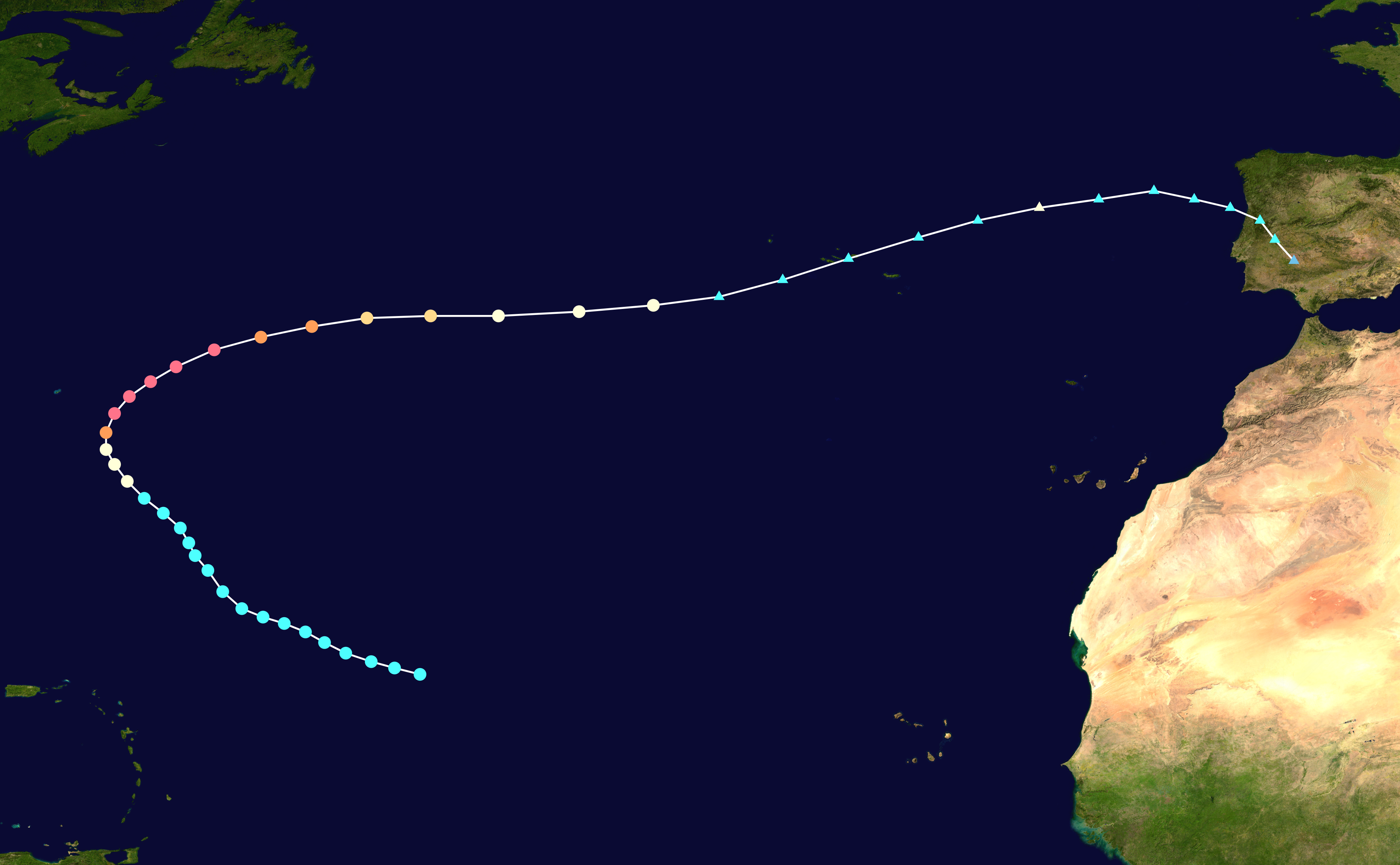
- Duration: September 17 – September 25
- Peak intensity: 140 mph (220 km/h) (1-min); 944 mbar (hPa)

On 12 September, a tropical wave moved off of the continent of Africa. The wave remained disorganized until 14 September, when the southern portion of the wave began organizing halfway between Africa and the Leeward Islands. Per scatterometer data, the wave attained gale-force winds on 16 September. On 17 September, the southern portion of the wave attempted to organize, but failed. An upper-level trough would then incite deep convection in the northern portion of the wave, where it would become Tropical Storm Gabrielle at 18:00 UTC later that day. Gabrielle initially struggled to become better organized due to high wind shear. At the time, the storm was being steered west-northwestward by a subtropical ridge over the central Atlantic. Wind shear subsided on 19 September, allowing for some intensification, still somewhat inhibited by dry air intruding. Convection also improved on the night of 19 September. On 20 September, Gabrielle encountered warmer sea surface temperatures, (SSTs) also aiding in intensification. On 21 September, an inner core formed and mid-level conditions became more humid, allowing for rapid intensification.

Gabrielle strengthened into a Category 1 hurricane at 18:00 UTC on 21 September and rapidly into a Category 4 hurricane with peak sustained winds of 140 miles per hour (230 km/h) at 00:00 UTC on 23 September about 180 miles (290 km) east of Bermuda. Gabrielle began losing strength through 23 and 24 September as it encountered cooler SSTs and stronger wind shear. Gabrielle's intensity dropped back to Category 1 strength early on 25 September. Most of its deep convection collapsed as further weakening occurred that afternoon while Gabrielle approached the Azores. Gabrielle lost its tropical characteristics at 18:00 UTC on 25 September, still southwest of the Azores. Gabrielle's center moved over the islands 26 September, with hurricane-force wind gusts. The extratropical system briefly regained hurricane-force sustained winds on 27 September. The low began to slow and weaken, passing over Portugal and opening into a trough over Spain on 28 September.

The East Coast of the United States, Bermuda, and the South Coast of the United Kingdom were impacted by rough seas. Some minor damage occurred in the Azores. Iberia was impacted by rain and winds from Gabrielle. Gabrielle's remnants caused significant flooding in eastern Spain, with damage totaling to €14.4 million (US$17.1 million).

=== Hurricane Humberto ===
- Category 5 hurricane (SSHWS)
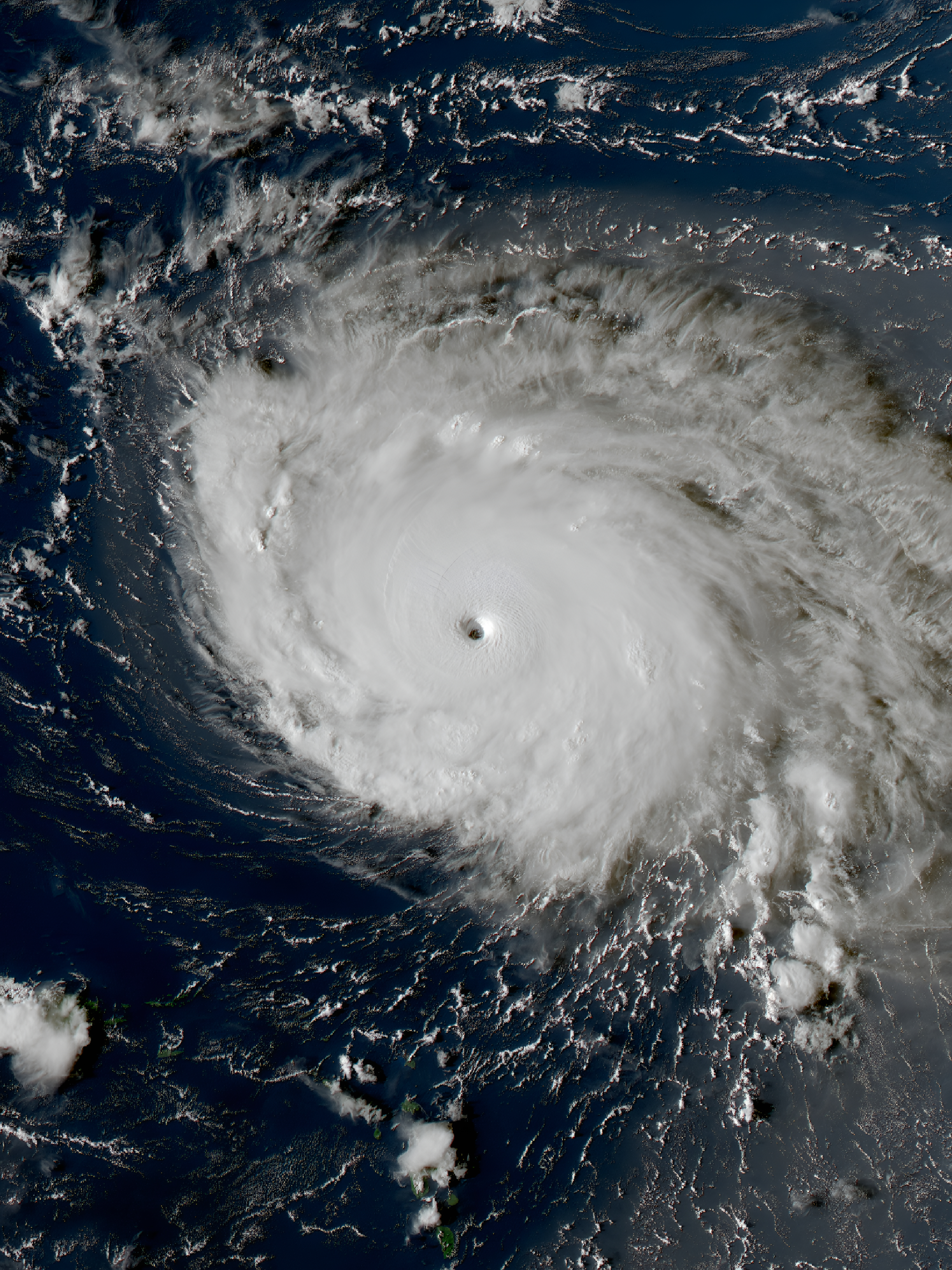
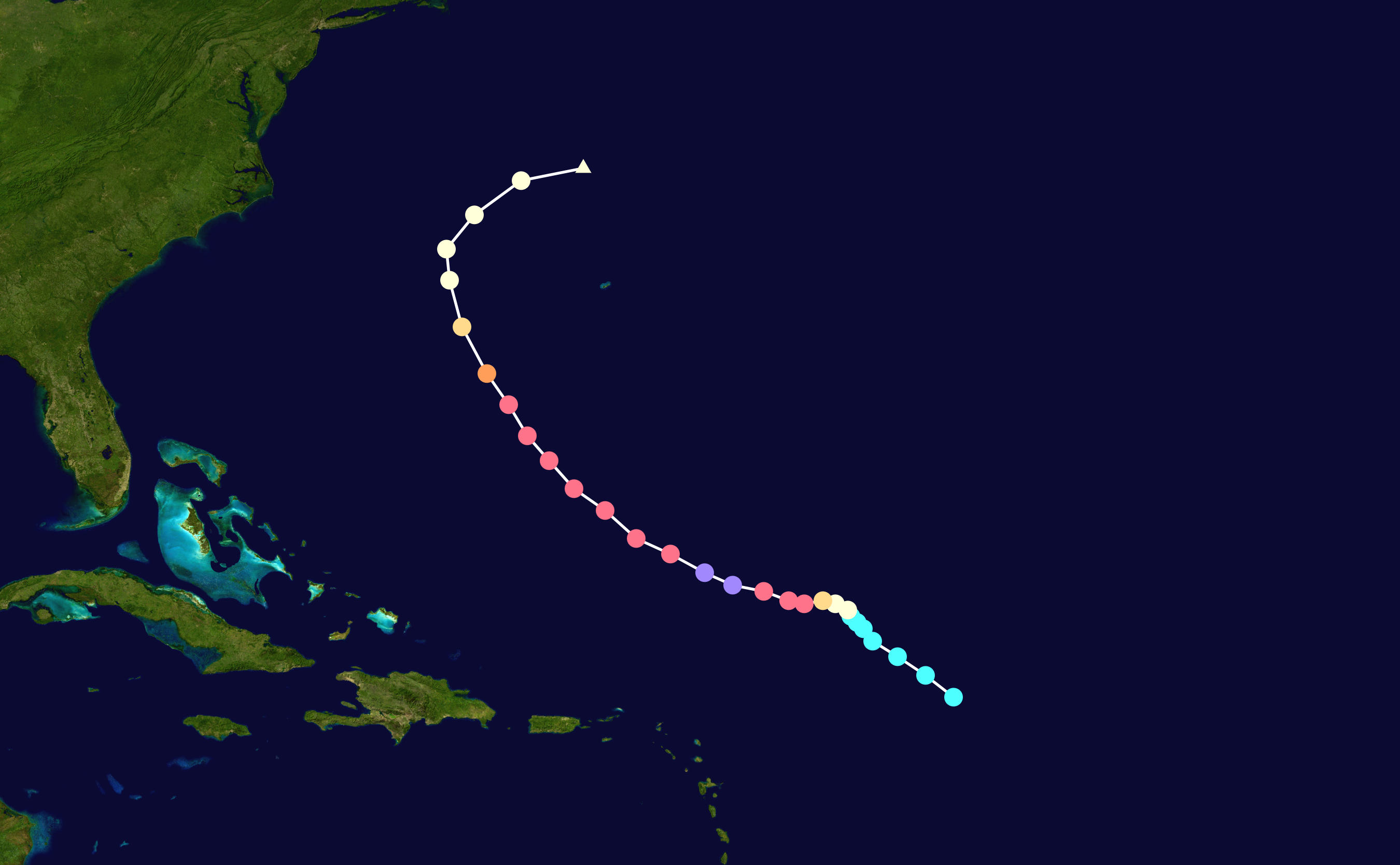
- Duration: September 24 – October 1
- Peak intensity: 160 mph (260 km/h) (1-min); 918 mbar (hPa)

Between September 18 and 19, a tropical wave moved offshore from the west coast of Africa. For several days, the wave was located amidst a mass of mostly dry air. Eventually, convection began to increase with a cyclonic wind pattern developing. Low-level circulation became well-defined by September 24, resulting in the formation of Tropical Storm Humberto that afternoon, about 605 mi (970 km) east-northeast of the northern Leeward Islands. Humberto initially traversed an environment of moderate wind shear, warm SSTs, and a moist atmosphere, allowing for the system to strengthen. Humberto was moving to the west-northwest for the first few days due to the subtropical ridge. A trough would weaken the ridge, causing Humberto to slow to less than 6 mph (9.7 km/h) from September 25 to September 27. The storm strengthened into a Category 1 hurricane on September 26 and an inner core formed due to a weakening in wind shear. The ridge would soon restrengthen, allowing Humberto to return to speed. At the same time, Humberto would undergo rapid intensification until late on September 27, when Humberto attained Category 5 strength, about 345 mi (555 km) north-northeast of the northern Leeward Islands. At 00:00 UTC on September 28, Humberto attained its peak intensity, with maximum sustained winds of 160 mph (260 km/h) and minimum central pressure of 918 mb (27.11 inHg).

That same day, Humberto turned northwestward and began a lengthy eyewall replacement cycle, taking 36 hours to complete, and causing the core to present a double eyewall for an extended period of time. Data collected around 00:00 UTC on September 29 by Hurricane Hunters and synthetic-aperture radar found the outer eyewall stronger than the interior, indicating the inner was subsiding and the exterior was becoming dominant. The system began to slightly restrengthen after the cycle through September 29. Then, SSTs began to cool, and wind shear strengthened, weakening Humberto. Humberto also turned northward in between Hurricane Imelda and a subtropical ridge. Moving north-northwestward that day, the system continued to weaken, falling to Category 3 strength by the end of the day, and then to Category 1 the following morning. By October 1, the hurricane turned to the northeast and the circulation became elongated, dissipating later that day as it was absorbed by a frontal zone.

A tropical storm watch was issued for Bermuda on September 28. On Bermuda, 2 in (51 mm) of rain fell, wind gusts of up to 41 mph (66 km/h), and coastal flooding was reported as Humberto passed the island. Minimal impact was reported in the territory. In Puerto Rico, moisture from Humberto and the precursor of Imelda fueled thunderstorms over the territory. Street flooding and landslides forced road closures. Damage throughout the region totaled to US$2,000. In Delaware, swells flooded roads and caused minor property damage. The tide gauge in Dewey Beach reached 4.38 feet (1.34 m).

=== Hurricane Imelda ===
- Category 1 hurricane (SSHWS)
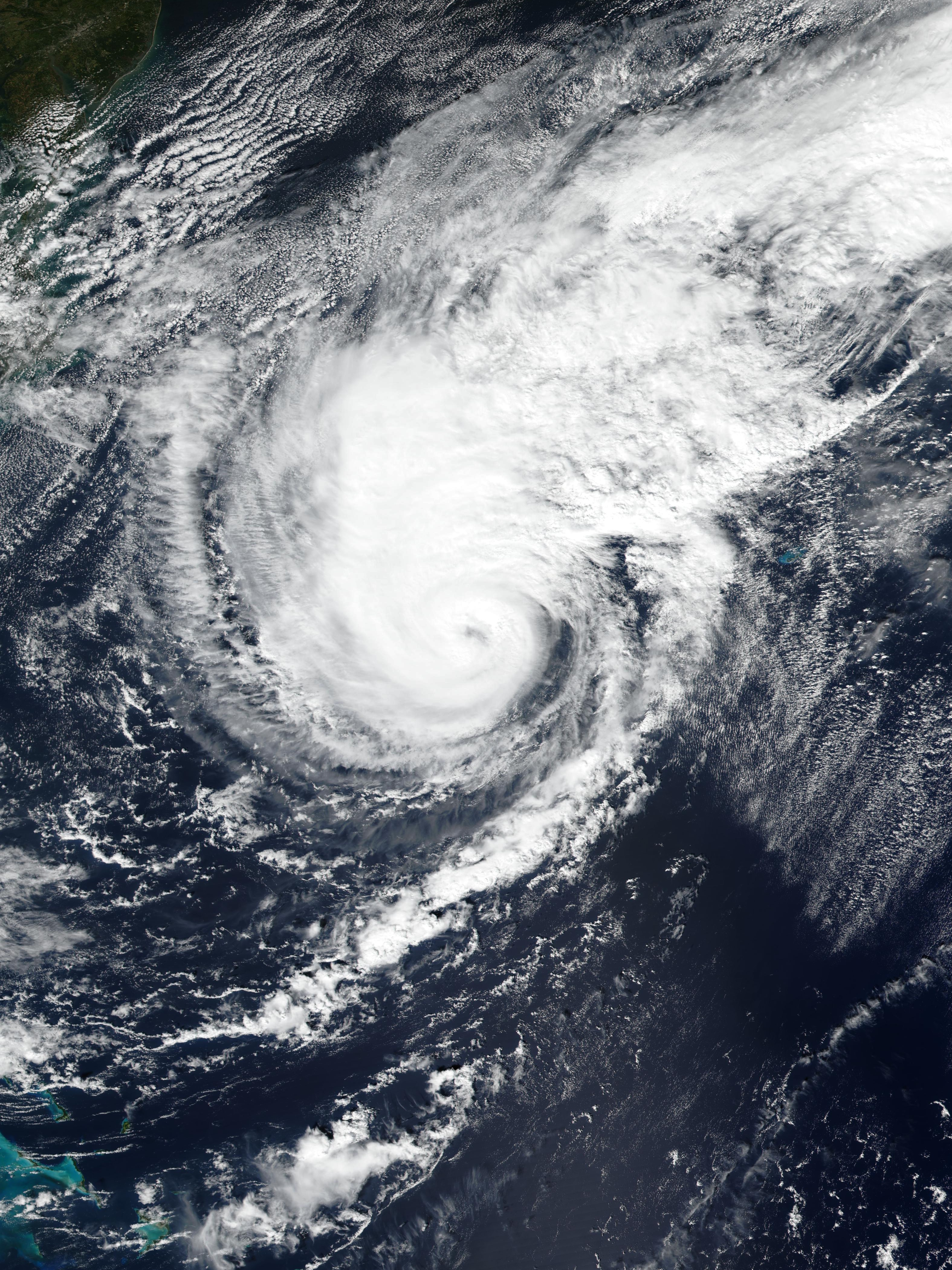
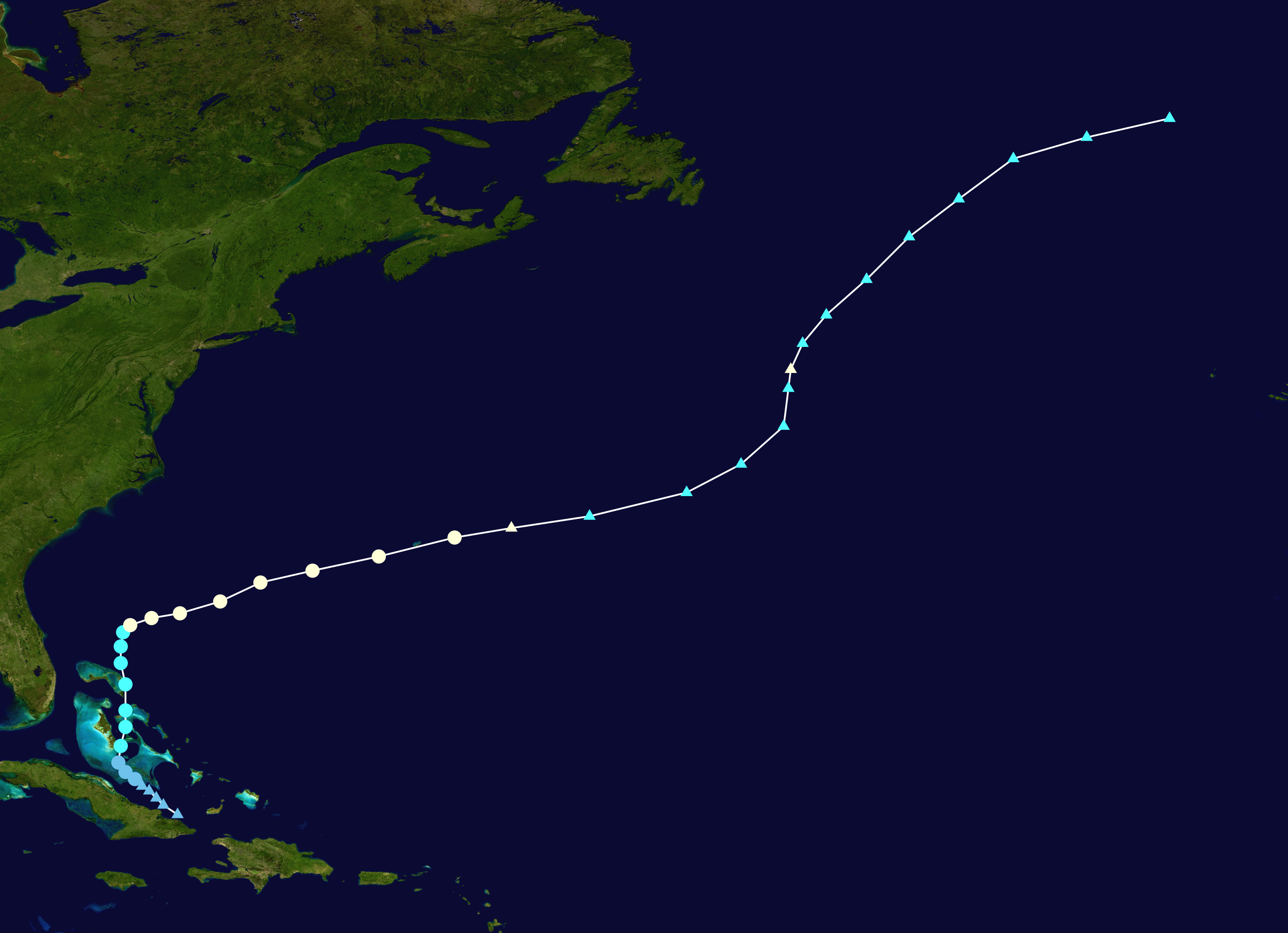
- Duration: September 28 – October 2
- Peak intensity: 90 mph (150 km/h) (1-min); 966 mbar (hPa)

On September 21, a tropical wave began producing disorganized showers and thunderstorms far east of the Windward Islands. On September 25, the disturbance began showing signs of organization near Hispaniola. A low-level circulation began to form within the disturbance the following day, at which time it was designated Potential Tropical Cyclone Nine. On the morning of September 27, more organization occurred, and the disturbance became Tropical Depression Nine. Moving slowly northward, the depression strengthened into Tropical Storm Imelda the following afternoon, about 370 mi (600 km) southeast of Cape Canaveral, Florida. Early on September 30, while over the central Bahamas, deep convection redeveloped along the western side of Imelda, and it turned to the northeast. That same morning, the storm strengthened into a Category 1 hurricane. On the evening of October 1, as the system began its transition into an extratropical cyclone, the eye of Imelda brushed the coast of Bermuda. Then, while moving quickly toward the east-northeast out to sea early the next morning, the system completed its extratropical transition.

The precursor disturbance produced squalls with torrential rains across Puerto Rico and the eastern Dominican Republic on September 23 and 24. A man died in Puerto Rico as flood waters swept his car away. Haiti, Turks and Caicos, and eastern Cuba also experienced heavy rains and gusty winds of the disturbance. Areas along the southeastern U.S. Atlantic coast received strong wind gusts and rain showers from Imelda, along with rough surf from Imelda and Hurricane Humberto combined. In North Carolina, waves caused eight homes along the Outer Banks shoreline to collapse. AON estimates that Imelda caused more than US$10 million in damage.

=== Tropical Storm Jerry ===
- Tropical storm (SSHWS)
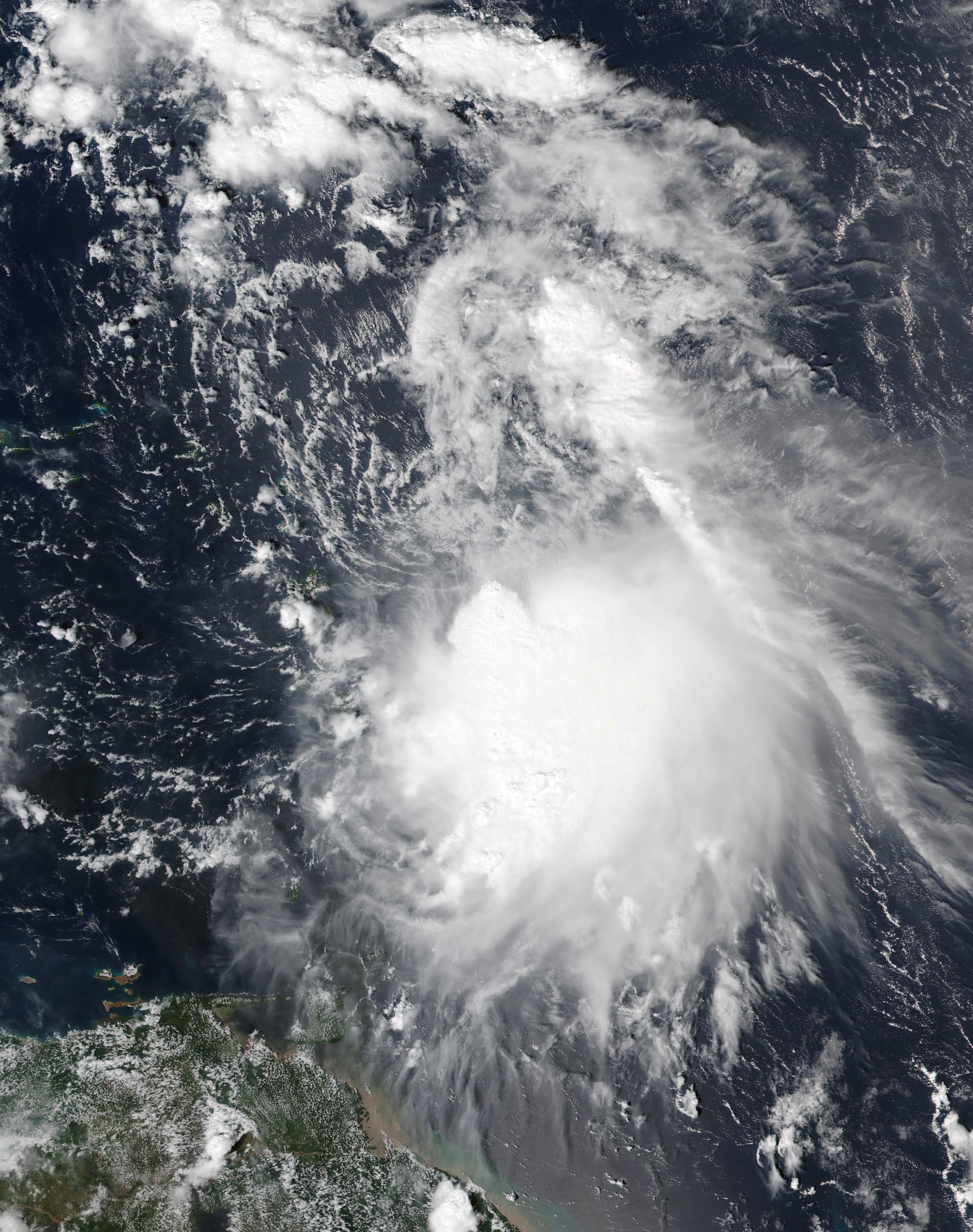
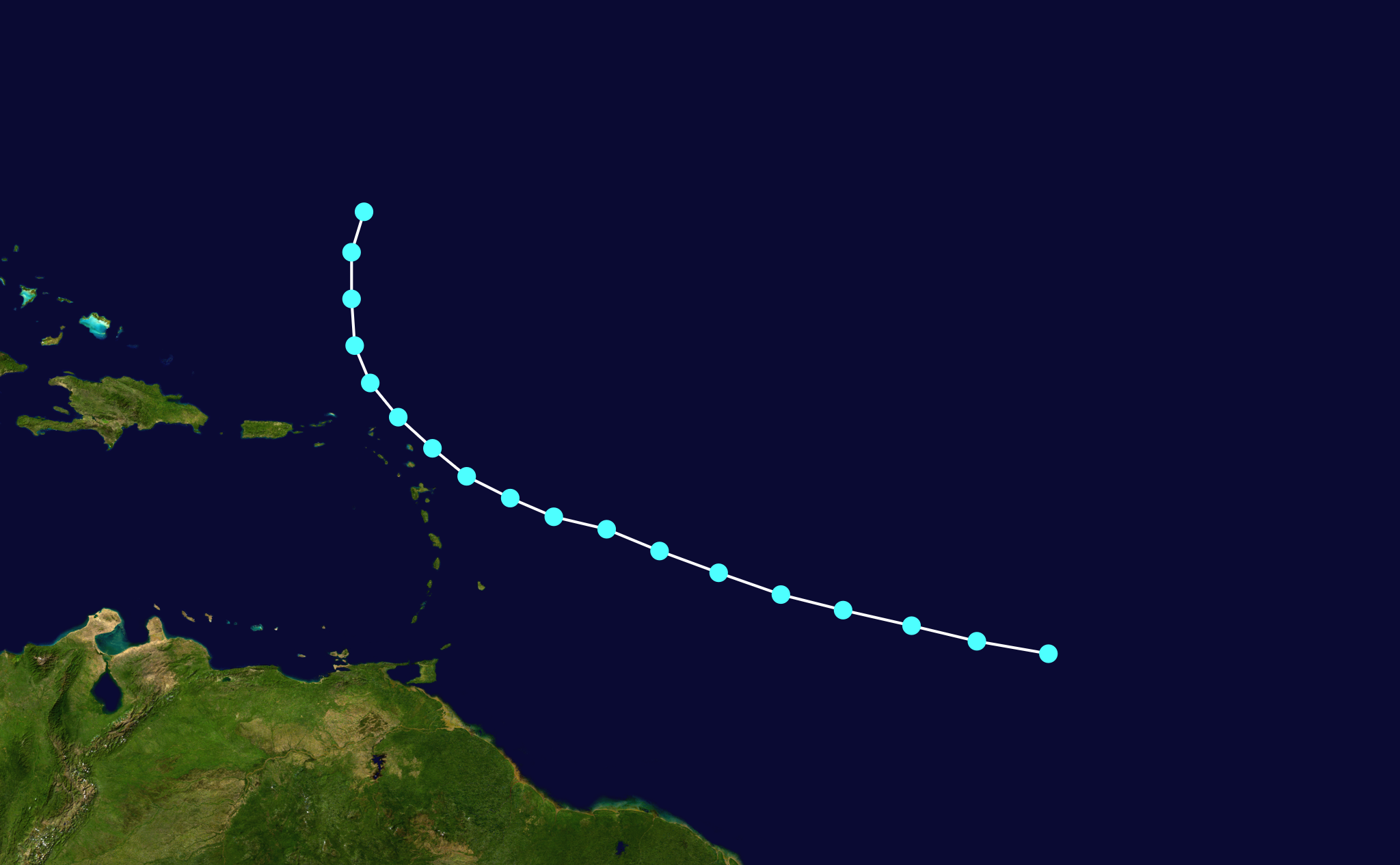
- Duration: October 7 – October 11
- Peak intensity: 65 mph (100 km/h) (1-min); 1000 mbar (hPa)

On October 3, a tropical wave emerged off the coast of Africa. The wave progressed across the Atlantic and grew more organized over the next few days, and became a tropical cyclone on October 7 around 1,300 miles (2,100 km) east of the Leeward Islands, after developing a low-level center and organized thunderstorm activity. Due to a subtropical ridge to the north, Jerry initially progressed to west-northwest. Jerry's speed, environmental wind shear, and dry air intrusions kept the storm asymmetric and from intensifying rapidly. By 18:00 UTC on October 8, the storm reached peak winds of 65 mph (100 km/h) about 600 miles (970 km) east-southeast of the Leeward Islands. Jerry remained at peak intensity for about a day while moving closer to the Leeward Islands. Jerry eventually met the edge of the ridge on October 9 and began moving northwestward, slower than before. On October 10, the storm made the closest approach to the Lesser Antilles with a distance of 30 miles (48 km) east of Barbuda. The system was asymmetrical leading to the most damaging wind and rain remaining at sea. Once Jerry moved north of the islands, tropical-storm-force winds impacted them. Later on October 10, Jerry turned northward and gradually weakened before opening into a trough on October 11. Remnant moisture from Jerry merged with a frontal boundary and developing nor'easter three days later.

Rainfall surpassed 9 in (230 mm) in some areas of Antigua and Barbuda, generating flash floods and minor landslides. Floods damaged equipment at the MET office building on Antigua. Major roads and businesses in Guadeloupe were inundated. In Le Moule, Guadeloupe, floods swept away a car, killing the driver. Damage in Guadeloupe was estimated at €300,000 (US$349,000). Moisture from Jerry caused flooding and lightning damage in Puerto Rico, with damage totaling to US$2,000.

=== Subtropical Storm Karen ===
- Subtropical storm (SSHWS)
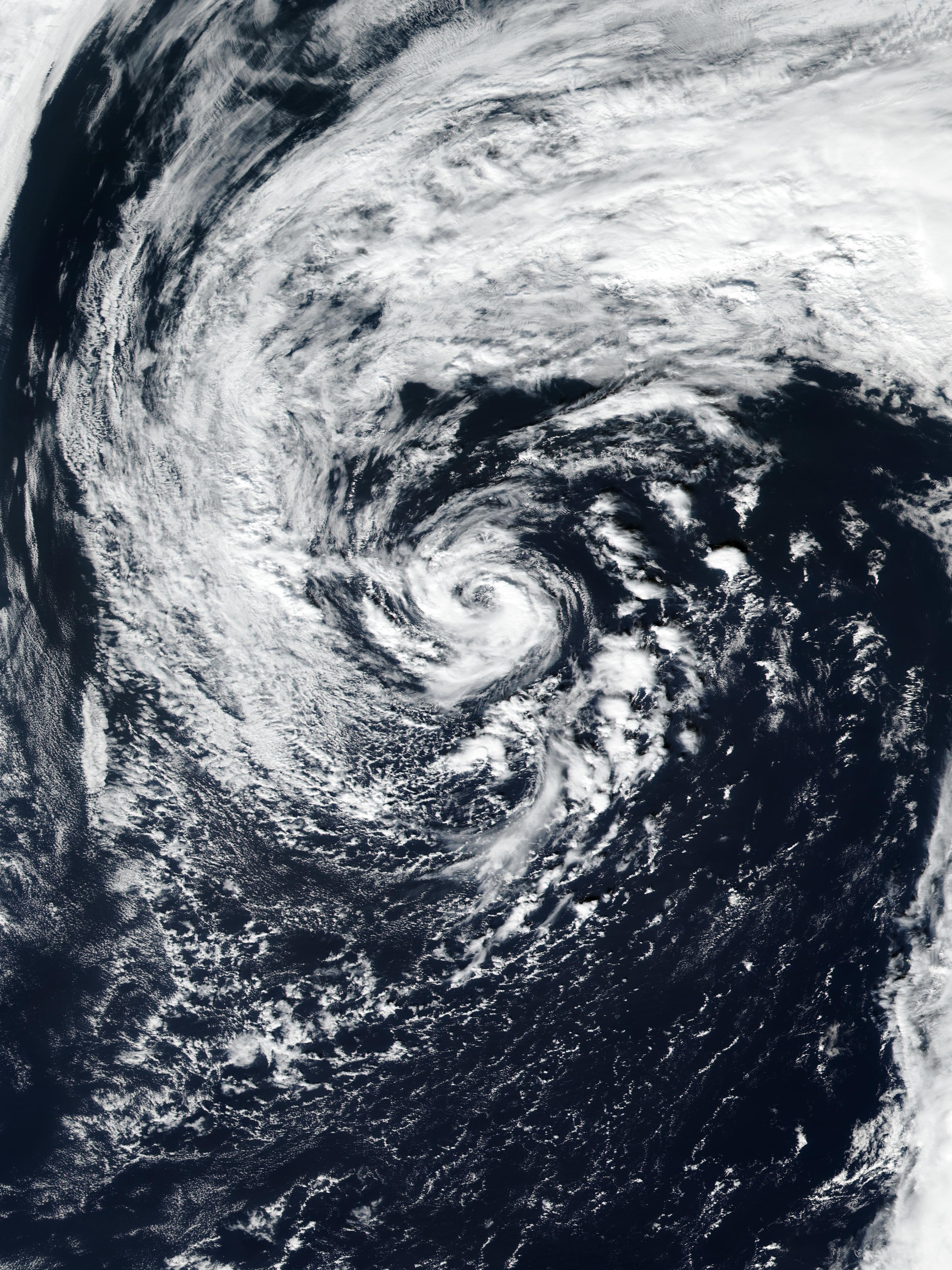
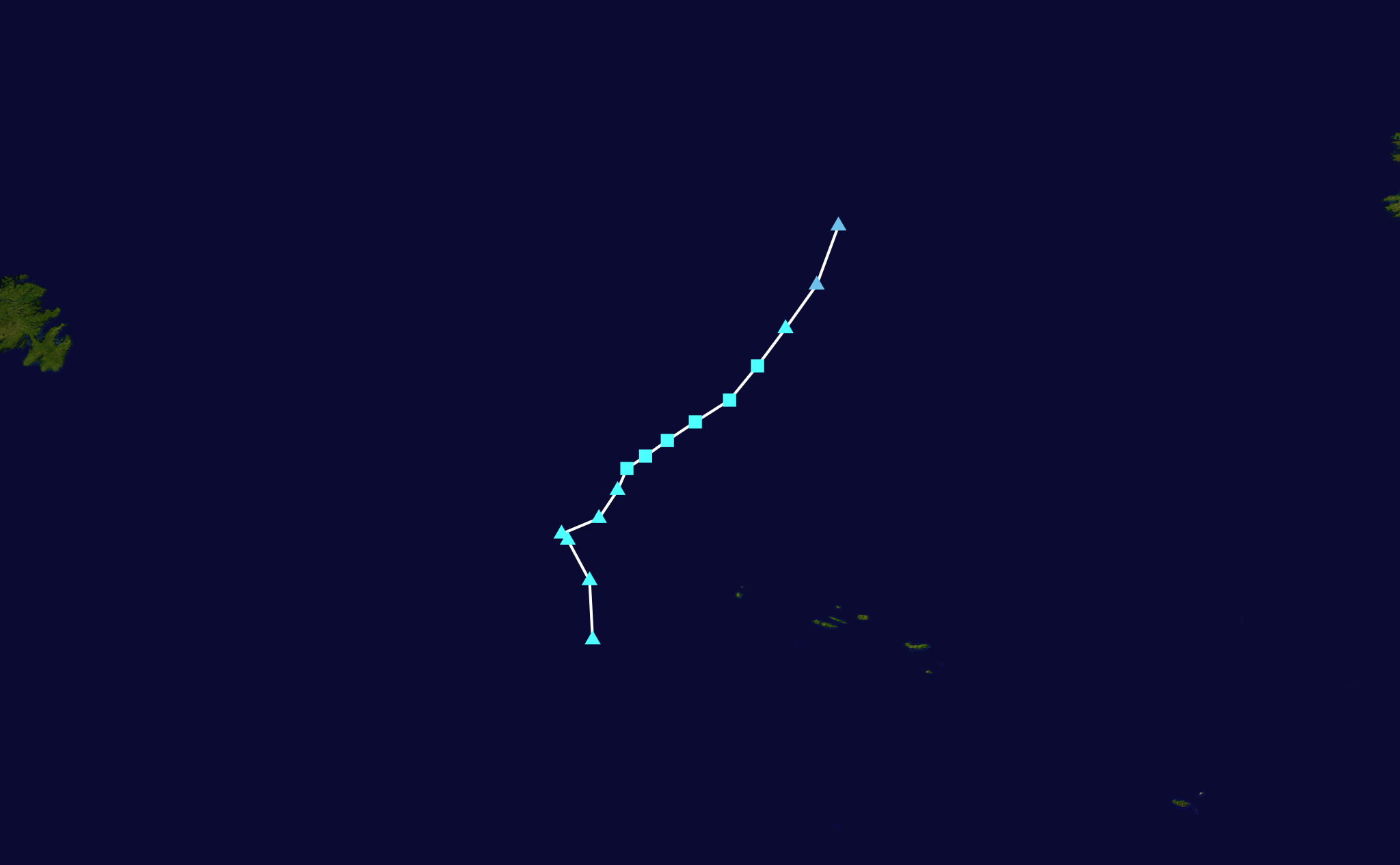
- Duration: October 9 – October 10
- Peak intensity: 45 mph (75 km/h) (1-min); 998 mbar (hPa)

On October 8, the frontal low pressure system that would lead to Karen's formation arose from an upper-level trough in the mid-latitude Atlantic. The low soon became occluded and the upper-level trough moved over the low pressure system. As the low moved to the northeast, convection began occurring closer to the center. A pass by Sentinel-1A found that the low was no longer attached to the frontal system and became classed as a subtropical cyclone via the Hebert-Poteat technique at 12:00 UTC on October 9. Sea surface temperatures were only 68 to 72 °F (20 to 22 °C), below what is typically required for tropical cyclogenesis. Karen was able to develop due to a suppressed tropopause and high-instability in the region. A compact storm with sustained winds of 45 mph (75 km/h), Karen tracked northeastward, producing some displaced moderate convection. As it moved north-northeastward that evening, the storm's convection fully dissipated, making the system a remnant low.

=== Tropical Storm Lorenzo ===
- Tropical storm (SSHWS)
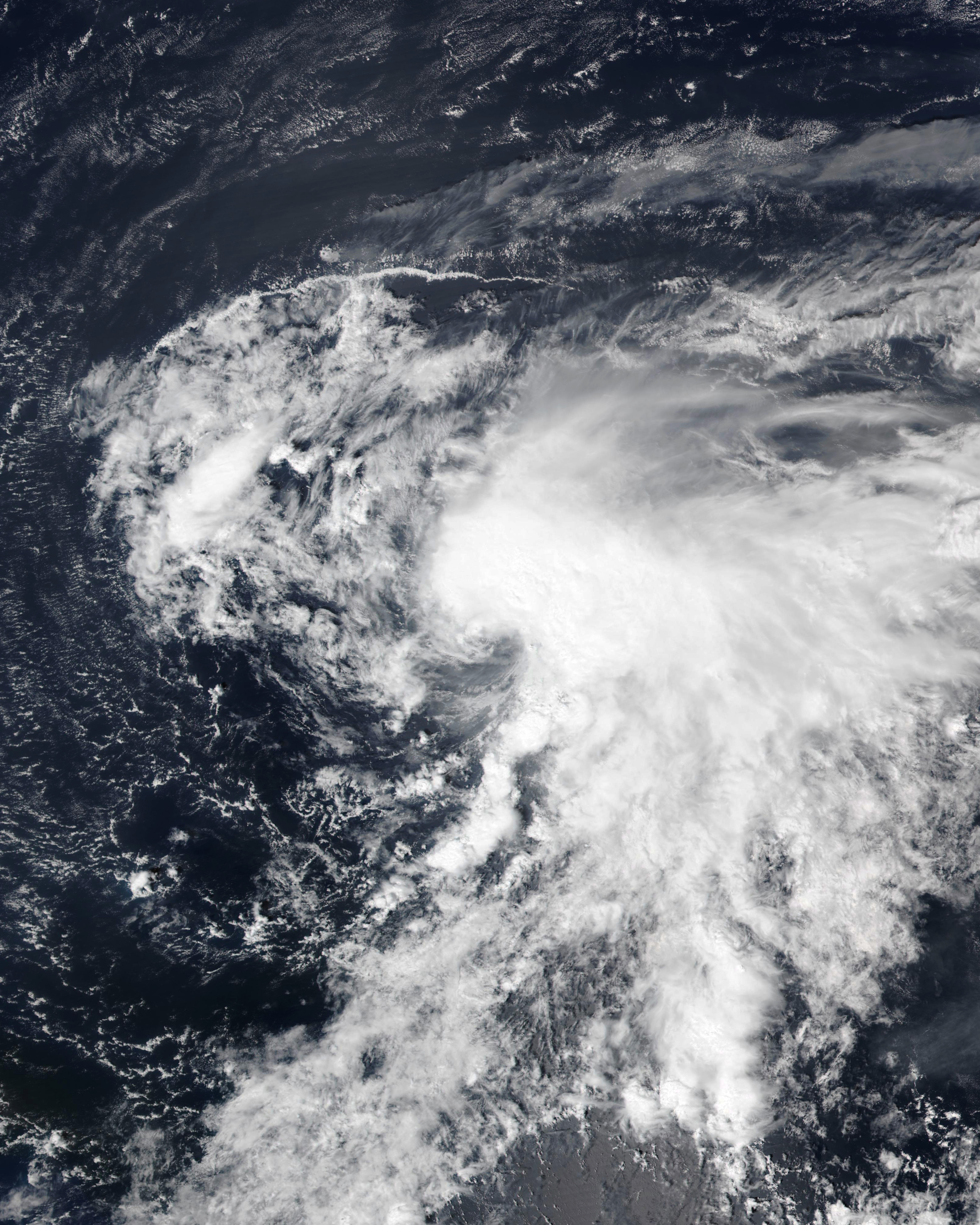
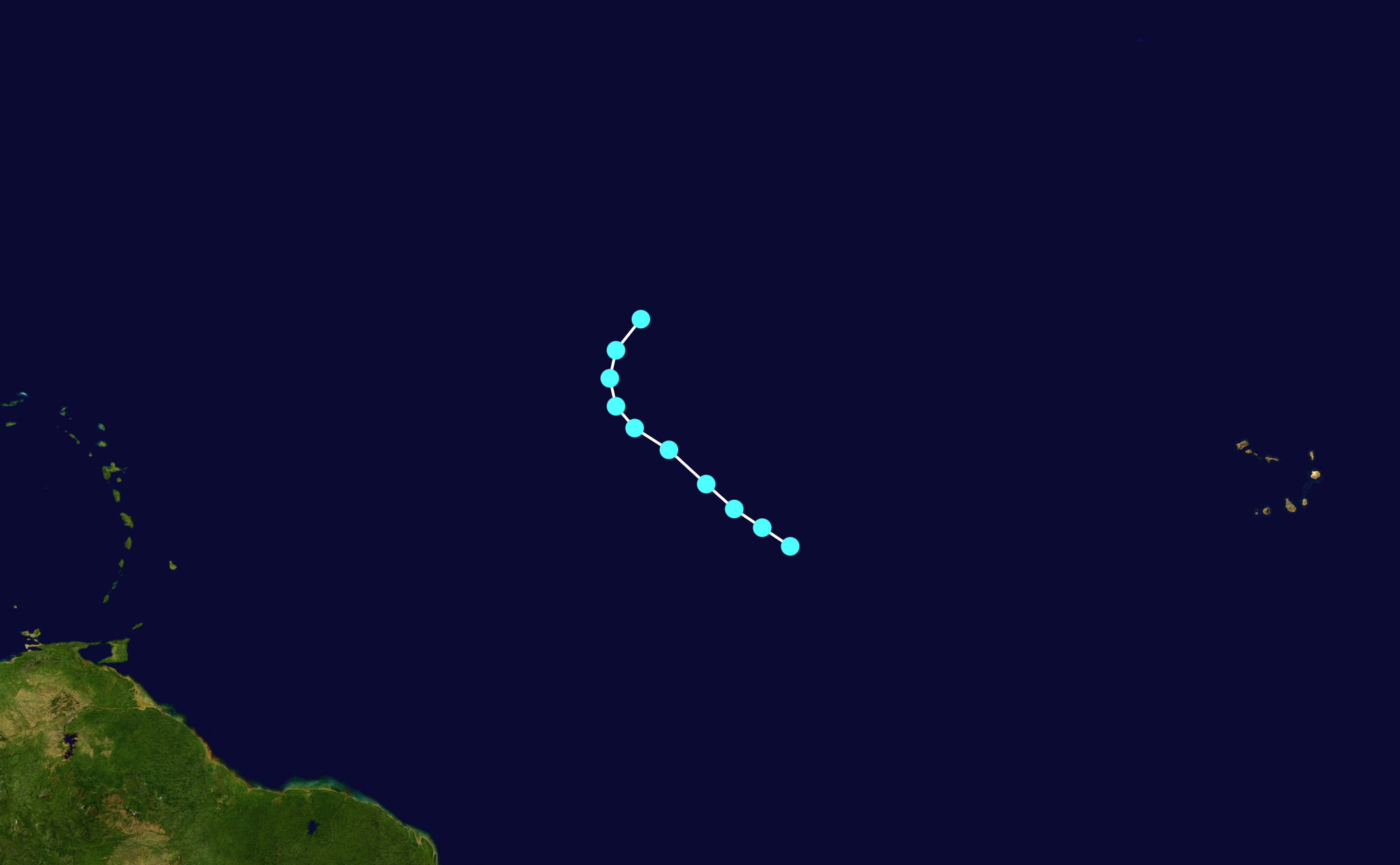
- Duration: October 13 – October 15
- Peak intensity: 60 mph (95 km/h) (1-min); 1000 mbar (hPa)

On October 9, a tropical wave emerged into the tropical Atlantic, passing south of Cape Verde, while producing widespread disorganized showers and thunderstorms as it moved west-northwestward over the next few days. Organization began on October 11. The disturbance became better organized late on October 12, producing tropical-storm-force winds, along with a large burst of deep convection. At 06:00 UTC on October 13, a well-defined circulation formed and the system became a tropical storm. At 00:00 UTC on October 14, wind speeds of 60 mph (97 km/h) was recorded, though maximum winds were likely undersampled. The maximum intensity was estimated to be 1000 millibars through the Knaff-Zehr-Courtney wind-pressure relationship. The storm became embedded in a sheared and dry environment on October 14, however, causing it to weaken. As a result of the adverse atmospheric conditions, the storm later struggled to produce organized convection and maintain a closed circulation, and on October 15, Lorenzo degenerated into a remnant low over the open eastern Atlantic.

=== Hurricane Melissa ===
- Category 5 hurricane (SSHWS)
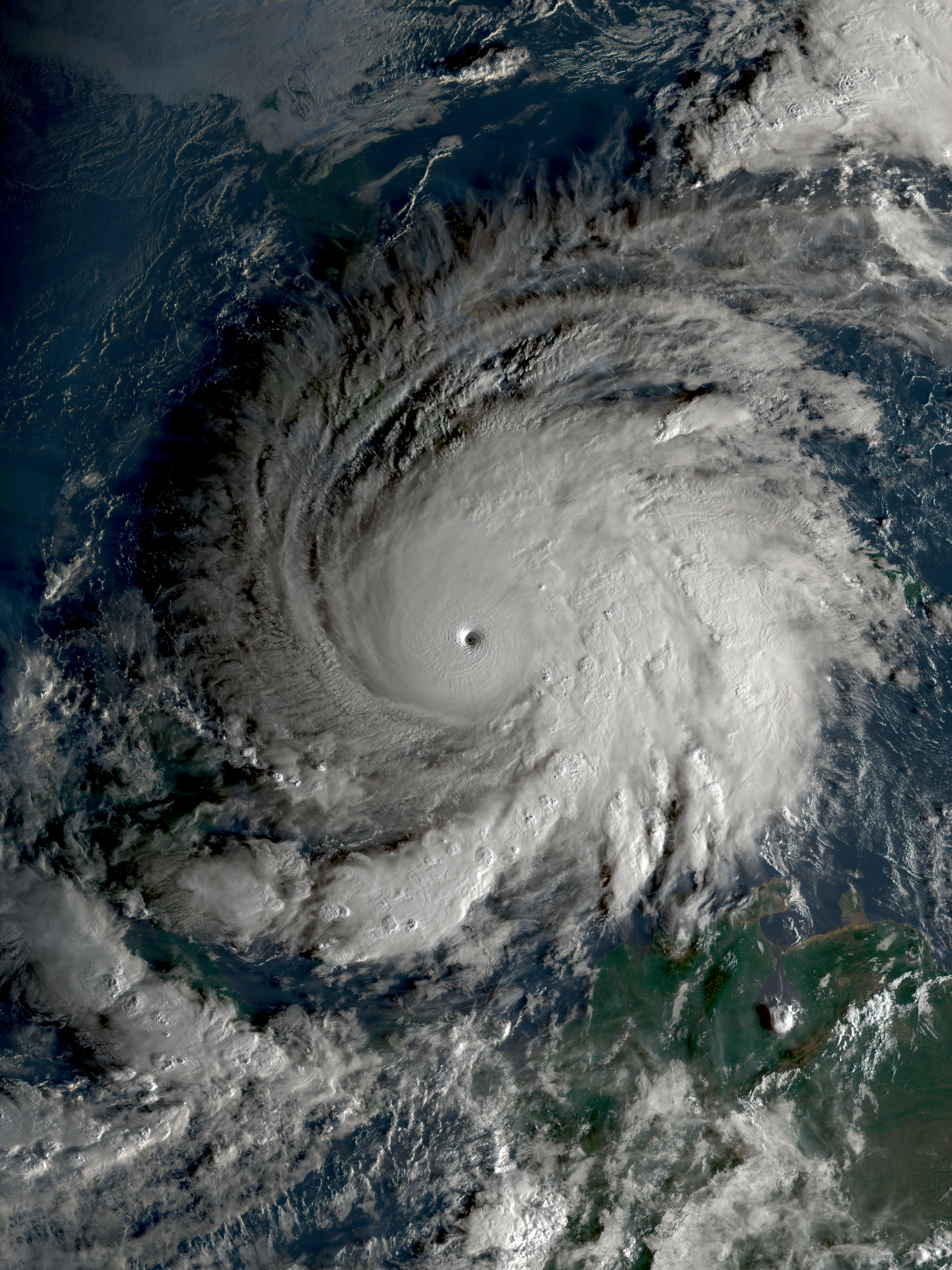
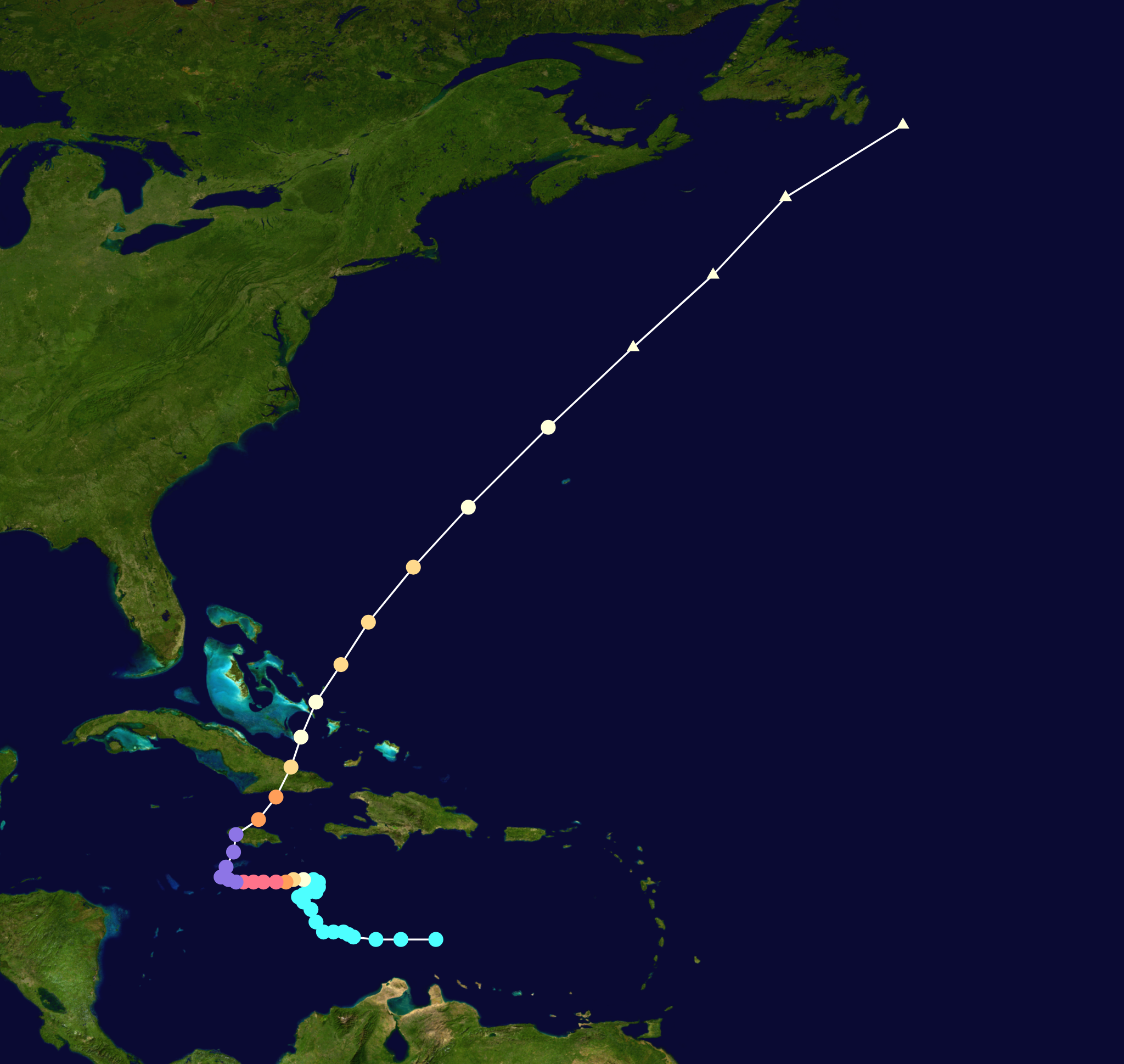
- Duration: October 21 – October 31
- Peak intensity: 190 mph (305 km/h) (1-min); 892 mbar (hPa)

On October 19, an extensive tropical wave moved through the Windward Islands and into the Caribbean Sea. The disturbance moved quickly westward, then slowed significantly, providing an opportunity for development of a well-defined center and organized deep convection early on October 21, becoming Tropical Storm Melissa. On account of weak steering currents, Melissa moved slowly and erratically west to northwest over the very warm waters of the central Caribbean for the next several days following formation, and was unable to strengthen appreciably due to westerly wind shear. Once the wind shear diminished, Melissa became better vertically aligned, turned more northward, and strengthened. Then, enabled by very favorable conditions, Melissa began a period of rapid intensification on October 25, reaching Category 4 hurricane strength early the next day. While moving generally westward, Melissa attained Category 5 status early on October 27. Melissa continued intensifying as it approached Jamaica, attaining maximum sustained winds of 190 mph (305 km/h) and a minimum central pressure of 892 mbar (hPa; 26.34 inHg) the next morning. Shortly after, at 17:25 UTC, the hurricane made landfall near New Hope in Westmoreland Parish, Jamaica, just below peak intensity later that afternoon as a result of land interaction. The hurricane weakened inland over the mountains, and emerged off Jamaica's north coast into the Caribbean at Category 3 strength. At 07:10 UTC the next morning, Melissa made landfall in Cuba, about 20 mi (30 km) east of Chivirico, with sustained winds of 115 mph (185 km/h). Inland, the rugged terrain of Cuba led to additional weakening, with of the storm's sustained winds falling to high-end Category 1 strength by the time Melissa moved back offshore, into the Atlantic Ocean, eight hours later. The system then began to accelerate to the northeast. However, Melissa re-strengthened into a Category 2 hurricane on October 30, after traversing the Bahamas. Melissa weakened again to Category 1 strength early on October 31, as it passed near Bermuda. That same day, Melissa completed its transition into a hurricane-force extratropical cyclone as a result of wind shear and cooler sea surface temperatures. The extratropical cyclone opened up into a trough the following day and was absorbed into a larger trough shortly afterwards.

In all, Melissa killed 95 people. In Haiti, a river flood killed 25, one person was killed by a falling tree in Marigot, while five others were injured by floods in Artibonite Department. Four died in the Dominican Republic. In total, at least 47 have died in Hispaniola. Three people died on Jamaica before the storm in the preparations phase, 45 were directly killed by Melissa, and several died due to mosquito-borne diseases. The precursor to Melissa brought heavy rain squalls to Barbados, where wind gusts up to 45 mph (74 km/h) were recorded at Grantley Adams International Airport. Additionally, peak gusts of 32 mph (52 km/h) at Saint Lucia and 37 mph (61 km/h) at Martinique were observed as well. In the Dominican Republic, streets across Santo Domingo became flooded. Nationwide, over one million homes were left without water service, as 56 aqueducts were put out of service by the storm. Western Jamaica was devastated by the hurricane with scores of buildings, including historical landmarks and public buildings, destroyed. Damage from the hurricane hurt Jamaica's tourism industry, with 40–50% of hotels damaged by Melissa. Agriculture suffered huge losses, with hundreds of thousands of acres of crops destroyed by Melissa. Leptospirosis outbreaks broke out after the storm related to standing water. In Cuba, widespread damage and flooding occurred across the eastern part of the nation. Over 900,000 houses and 600 medical facilities were damaged or destroyed. In the aftermath of Melissa, several organizations sent donations to help the affected islands, particularly Cuba and Jamaica, recover.

== Storm names ==
The following list of names was used for named storms that formed in the North Atlantic in 2025. This is the same list used in the 2019 season, with the exception of Dexter, which replaced Dorian. The name Dexter was used for the first time this season.

- Andrea
- Barry
- Chantal
- Dexter
- Erin
- Fernand
- Gabrielle
- Humberto
- Imelda
- Jerry
- Karen
- Lorenzo
- Melissa
- Nestor (unused)
- Olga (unused)
- Pablo (unused)
- Rebekah (unused)
- Sebastien (unused)
- Tanya (unused)
- Van (unused)
- Wendy (unused)

=== Retirement ===
On March 4, 2026, during the 48th Session of the RA IV Hurricane Committee, the World Meteorological Organization retired the name Melissa from its rotating name lists due to the widespread destruction and loss of life from the storm, particularly in Jamaica, and it will not be used again in the North Atlantic basin. It was replaced with Molly, which will first appear on the 2031 season list.

== Season effects ==
This is a table of all of the storms that formed in the 2025 Atlantic hurricane season. It includes their duration, names, intensities, areas affected, damages, and death totals. Deaths in parentheses are additional and indirect (an example of an indirect death would be a traffic accident), but were still related to that storm. Damage and deaths include totals while the storm was extratropical, a wave, or a low, and all of the damage figures are in 2025 USD.

Saffir–Simpson scale
TD	TS	C1	C2	C3	C4	C5

2025 North Atlantic tropical cyclone season statistics
Storm name	Dates active	Storm category at peak intensity	Max 1-min wind mph (km/h)	Min. press. (mbar)	Areas affected	Damage (US$)	Deaths	Ref(s).
Andrea	June 23–24	Tropical storm	40 (65)	1014	None	None	None	
Barry	June 28–30	Tropical storm	45 (75)	1006	Northern Central America, Yucatán Peninsula, Eastern Mexico, South Texas	>$5.87 million	8	
Chantal	July 4–7	Tropical storm	60 (95)	1002	Southeastern United States, Mid-Atlantic United States	$500 million	6	
Dexter	August 3–6	Tropical storm	60 (95)	999	None	None	None	
Erin	August 11–22	Category 5 hurricane	160 (260)	913	Cape Verde, Leeward Islands, Greater Antilles, Lucayan Archipelago, East Coast of the United States, Bermuda, Coastal Nova Scotia, Newfoundland, Iceland	$25 million	13	
Fernand	August 23–27	Tropical storm	60 (95)	999	None	None	None	
Gabrielle	September 17–25	Category 4 hurricane	140 (220)	944	East Coast of the United States, Bermuda, Azores, Iberian Peninsula	$17.1 million	None	
Humberto	September 24 – October 1	Category 5 hurricane	160 (260)	918	Bermuda, East Coast of the United States	Minimal	None	
Imelda	September 28 – October 2	Category 1 hurricane	90 (150)	966	Leeward Islands, Greater Antilles, Lucayan Archipelago, Southeastern United States, Bermuda	>$10 million	2 (1)	
Jerry	October 7–11	Tropical storm	65 (100)	1000	Lesser Antilles	$351,000	1	
Karen	October 9–10	Subtropical storm	45 (75)	998	None	None	None	
Lorenzo	October 13–15	Tropical storm	60 (95)	1000	None	None	None	
Melissa	October 21–31	Category 5 hurricane	190 (305)	892	Windward Islands, Greater Antilles, Lucayan Archipelago, Bermuda, Coastal Northeastern United States	>$12.2 billion	95 (2)	
Season aggregates
13 systems	June 23 – October 31		190 (305)	892		>$12.7 billion	126 (3)	

== See also ==
- Weather of 2025
- Tropical cyclones in 2025
- 2025 Pacific hurricane season
- 2025 Pacific typhoon season
- 2025 North Indian Ocean cyclone season
- South-West Indian Ocean cyclone seasons: 2024–25, 2025–26
- Australian region cyclone seasons: 2024–25, 2025–26
- South Pacific cyclone seasons: 2024–25, 2025–26
