= Litchfield Plantation =

Coordinates: 32.70656°N 89.05598°W

Litchfield Plantation in Pawleys Island, South Carolina, is one of the oldest rice plantations on the Waccamaw River.

== History ==
The plantation traces its formation to three land grants of 500, 500 and 420 acres (1.7 km^{2}) from King George III to Thomas Hepworth, in 1710, 1712 and 1711. The plantation was named "Litchfield" by Peter Simon, with the first reported statement of its existence occurring in his will. The original mansion or "Plantation House" was built in 1740.

The most celebrated owner of the plantation was the Tucker Family of Georgetown, South Carolina. The Tucker family originally came to South Carolina from Bermuda. Daniel Tucker was a politician and had three sons. The eldest, John Tucker eventually inherited the plantation and perfected growing methods for rice on the property. By 1850 Litchfield Plantation was producing one million pounds of rice per year. John had 9 sons by 4 wives.

Upon the death of John Tucker ownership passed to his son Dr. Henry Massingberd Tucker. Dr. Tucker served as a volunteer with the Confederate Army for four years during the American Civil War. He was also a staunch Episcopalian and when a new church was built had the old All Saints Church dismantled and moved to his property. In order to compel church attendance by the slaves who worked the plantation Dr. Tucker withheld weekly rations of food and tobacco from those slaves who did not attend services. Dr. Tucker was also a sportsman and won many tournaments at the Georgetown Rifle Club.

== List of owners (chronological) ==
Peter Simon, circa 1794
John Simon, circa 1794 (acquired upon the death of Peter Simon and sold to Daniel Tucker prior to 1796)
Daniel Tucker, circa 1794–1797
John Hyrne Tucker, 1797–1859
Dr. Henry Massingberd Tucker, 1859–1897
Breslauer, Lachicotte and Company, 1897–1901
Louis Claude Lachicotte, 1901–1904
Col. Ralph Nesbit, 1904–1911
Joshua John Ward and Arthur Herbert Lachicotte, 1911–1926
Dr. Henry Norris, 1926–1942
Harry Edmond Parker, J. Philip Booth and Thornwell Hay Parker, 1942–1957
James B. Moore, E. Craig Wall, William N. Miller Jr., Howard Hinman Jr., 1957–1966
Louise Price Parsons, 1966
Litchfield Plantation Company

== Slavery ==
Little is recorded of the history of slavery at Litchfield plantation, although it is established by many sources that slaves were used to work the plantation. One of the distinguishing characteristics of Litchfield plantation is the existence of a cemetery utilized by slaves of Litchfield plantation and their descendants. According to an archaeological investigation performed by Brockington and Associates in 1989 the cemetery holds approximately 150 possible graves. Only 2 of these graves are marked, with dates in 1888 and 1920.

== Ghost stories ==
Like much of the low country, Litchfield Plantation boasts a number of ghost stories. These stories center around Dr. Henry Massingberd Tucker. One of the stories involves the ghost of Dr. Tucker returning to the plantation on horseback after performing a midnight house call. It has been anecdotally reported that he rings the bell at the entrance gate to alert the stable hands that he had returned, followed by the sound of a horse trotting down the main lane. The other stories involve the ghost of Dr. Tucker appearing in the plantation house and the sound of a person walking on the back staircase.

== Today ==
Litchfield Plantation is currently in the process of being developed as a master-planned residential community. The original Mansion is now used as a homeowner's social club, and the original site of the stables is now occupied by The Abbey, an Anglican Mission church.

The plantation has given its name to the nearby community of Litchfield Beach.

== See also ==
- Slavery in the United States
