= Litchfield Beach, South Carolina =

Coordinates: 33°28′01″N 79°5′59″W

- Census-designated place
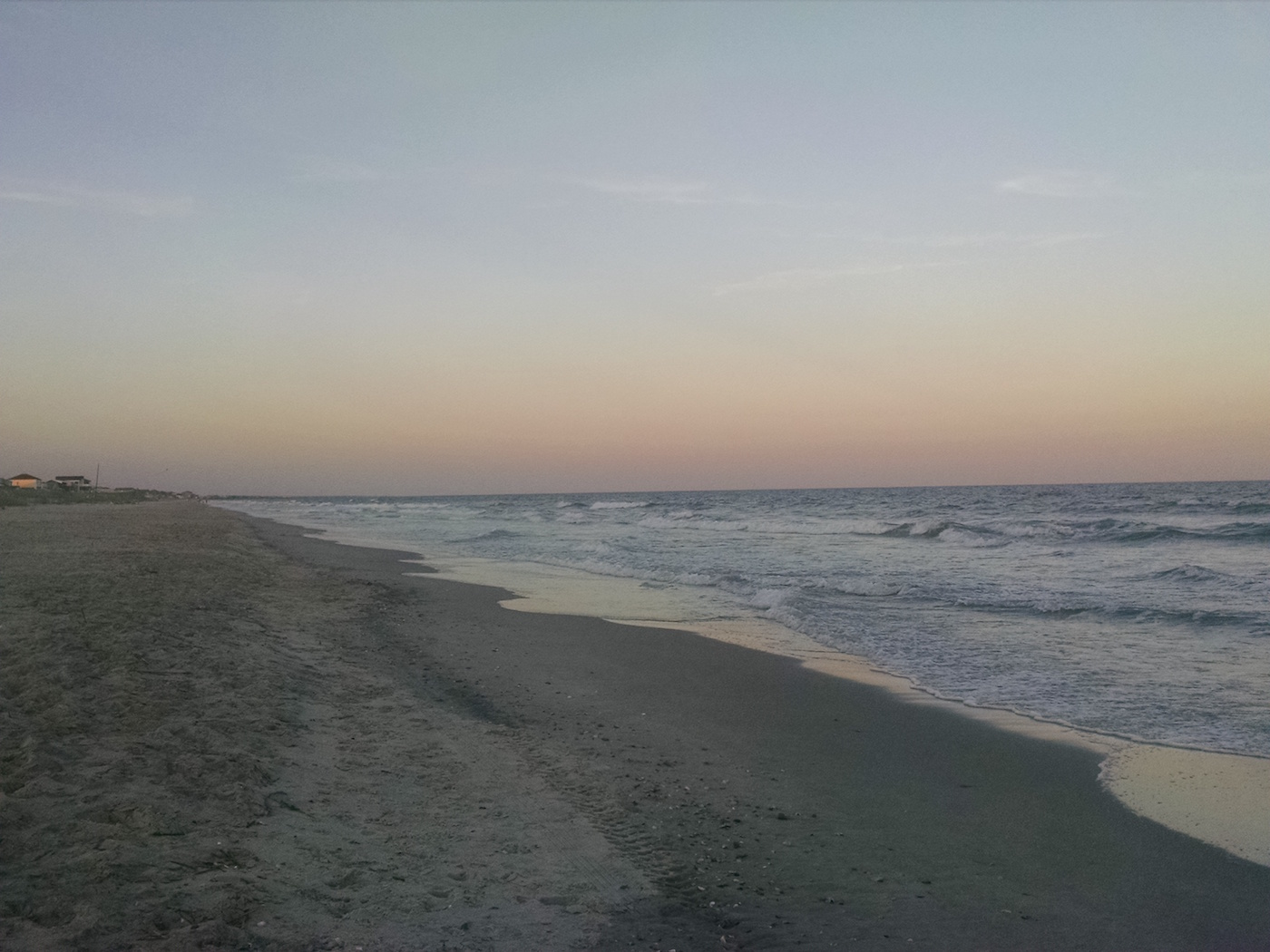
- Litchfield beach
- Nickname: Litchfield
- Interactive map of Litchfield Beach, South Carolina
- Country: United States
- State: South Carolina
- County: Georgetown
- Developed: 1960

Area
  - Total: 11.70 sq mi (30.29 km^{2})
  - Land: 11.22 sq mi (29.07 km^{2})
  - Water: 0.47 sq mi (1.21 km^{2})
- Elevation: 20 ft (6.1 m)

Population (2020)
  - Total: 8,370
  - Density: 745.6/sq mi (287.88/km^{2})
- Time zone: UTC-5 (EST)
  - Summer (DST): UTC-4 (EDT)
- ZIP code: 29585
- Area code: 843
- FIPS code: 45-41830
- GNIS feature ID: 2812957

Litchfield Beach, also known simply as Litchfield, is an unincorporated community and census-designated place (CDP) in Georgetown County, South Carolina, United States. It was first listed as a CDP in the 2020 census with a population of 8,370.

It lies three miles north of Pawleys Island, on the South Carolina Grand Strand. The communities Litchfield-By-The-Sea and North Litchfield are within Litchfield Beach.

The community takes its name from Litchfield Plantation, a rice plantation founded early in the 18th century. It initially started in the 1950s as Retreat Beach. Modern development of the community began in the 1960s.

== Demographics ==
Historical population
Census	Pop.	Note	%±
2020	8,370		—
U.S. Decennial Census; 2020

Litchfield Beach first appeared as a census designated place in the 2020 U.S. census.

=== 2020 census ===
Litchfield Beach CDP, South Carolina – Demographic Profile (NH = Non-Hispanic)
Race / Ethnicity	Pop 2020	% 2020
White alone (NH)	7,094	84.76%
Black or African American alone (NH)	753	9.00%
Native American or Alaska Native alone (NH)	17	0.20%
Asian alone (NH)	34	0.41%
Pacific Islander alone (NH)	10	0.12%
Some Other Race alone (NH)	23	0.27%
Mixed Race/Multi-Racial (NH)	198	2.37%
Hispanic or Latino (any race)	241	2.88%
Total	8,370	100.00%

Note: the US Census treats Hispanic/Latino as an ethnic category. This table excludes Latinos from the racial categories and assigns them to a separate category. Hispanics/Latinos can be of any race.
