= Tropical cyclones in 2025 =

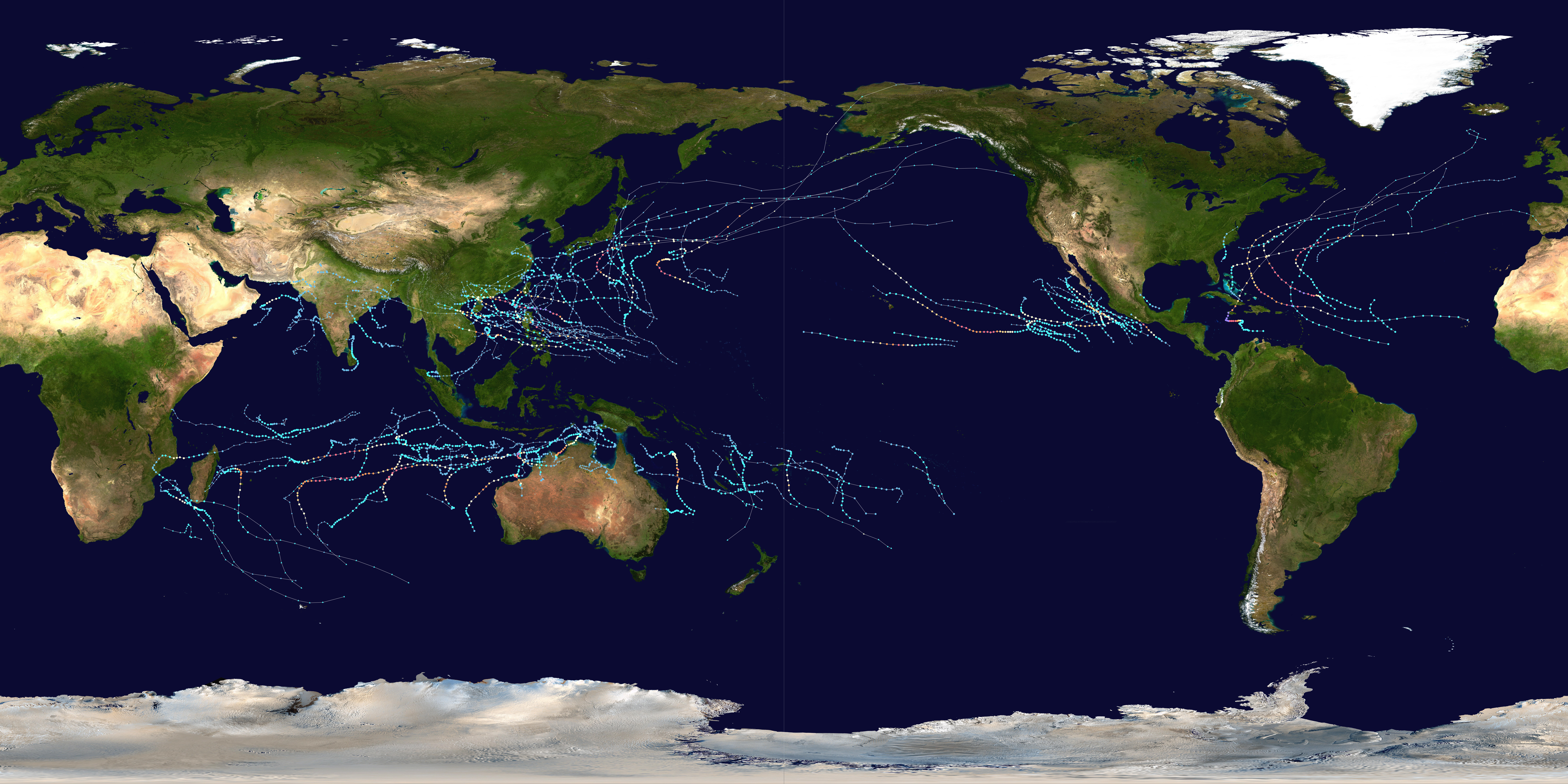
- Year summary map

Year boundaries
- First system: 03F
- Formed: January 5, 2025
- Last system: Grant
- Dissipated: January 6, 2026

Strongest system
- Name: Melissa
- Lowest pressure: 892 mbar (hPa); 26.34 inHg

Longest lasting system
- Name: Grant
- Duration: 22 days

Year statistics
- Total systems: 134
- Named systems: 96
- Total fatalities: 3,983 total
- Total damage: $49.559 billion (2025 USD)
Related articles
- 2025 Atlantic hurricane season
- 2025 Pacific hurricane season
- 2025 Pacific typhoon season
- 2025 North Indian Ocean cyclone season
- 2024–25 South-West Indian Ocean cyclone season
- 2025–26 South-West Indian Ocean cyclone season
- 2024–25 Australian region cyclone season
- 2025–26 Australian region cyclone season
- 2024–25 South Pacific cyclone season
- 2025–26 South Pacific cyclone season

Satellite photos of the 27 tropical cyclones worldwide that reached at least Category 3 on the Saffir–Simpson scale during 2025, from Dikeledi in January to Grant in December. Among them, Melissa (fourth image on the fourth line) is the most intense with a minimum central pressure of 892 hPa.

During 2025, tropical cyclones formed in seven major bodies of water, commonly known as tropical cyclone basins. They were named by various weather agencies when they attained maximum sustained winds of 35 knots (65 km/h; 40 mph). Throughout the year, a total of 133 systems formed, with 95 of them being named or possessing tropical storm-force winds. The most intense storm of the year was Hurricane Melissa in the North Atlantic Ocean, which had a minimum pressure of 892 hPa (26.34 inHg). The deadliest and costliest tropical cyclone of the year was Cyclone Senyar in the North Indian Ocean, which caused at least 2,253 deaths and over $20 billion in damage in Thailand, Malaysia and Indonesia. Among this year's systems, twenty-seven became major tropical cyclones, of which six intensified into Category 5 tropical cyclones on the Saffir–Simpson scale (SSHWS). The accumulated cyclone energy (ACE) index for the 2025 (seven basins combined), as calculated by Colorado State University (CSU) was 728.6 units, which was near-normal of the 1991–2020 mean of 770.2 units.

The most active basin in the year was the Western Pacific Ocean, which had twenty-seven named systems. The Eastern Pacific Ocean had an above-average season, with twenty named storms forming; eleven of those became hurricanes, of which four further strengthened into major hurricanes. The North Atlantic Ocean had a total of thirteen named storms. The North Indian Ocean was active, with four named storms forming. Activity across the southern hemisphere's three basins (South-West Indian, Australian, and South Pacific) was fairly significant, with the regions recording twenty-nine named storms altogether, with the most intense Southern Hemisphere cyclone of the year, Cyclone Vince in the South-West Indian basin, peaking with a central pressure of 923 hPa.

Tropical cyclones are primarily monitored by ten warning centers around the world, which are designated as a Regional Specialized Meteorological Center (RSMC) or a Tropical Cyclone Warning Center (TCWC) by the World Meteorological Organization (WMO). These centers are: National Hurricane Center (NHC), Central Pacific Hurricane Center (CPHC), Japan Meteorological Agency (JMA), Indian Meteorological Department (IMD), Météo-France (MFR), Indonesia's Meteorology, Climatology, and Geophysical Agency (BMKG), Australian Bureau of Meteorology (BoM), Papua New Guinea's National Weather Service (PNGNWS), Fiji Meteorological Service (FMS), and New Zealand's MetService. Unofficial, but still notable, warning centers include the Philippine Atmospheric, Geophysical and Astronomical Services Administration (PAGASA; albeit official within the Philippines), the United States's Joint Typhoon Warning Center (JTWC), and the Brazilian Navy Hydrographic Center.

== Global atmospheric and hydrological conditions ==
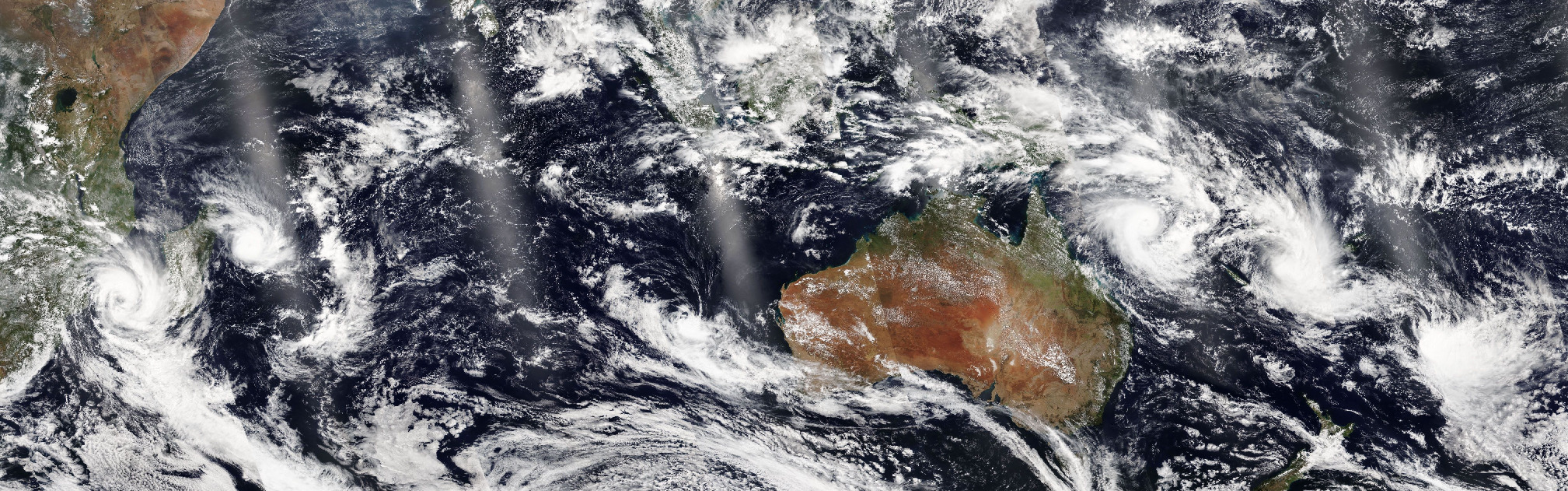
Satellite imagery of six tropical cyclones active simultaneously across the Southern Hemisphere: Honde (farthest left), Garance (left), Bianca (center), Alfred (center right), Seru (right), Rae (farthest right)

In April 2025, the waning La Niña reached a point of neutral, and as such Pacific sea surface temperatures (SSTs) became stable to the average. This resulted in an above average Eastern Pacific hurricane season. In the North Atlantic, warmer than average SSTs led to an above average season, with one of the most intense hurricanes of all time (Hurricane Melissa) forming this season. The season's activity was also influenced by the state of the trade winds, which were weaker this season.

== Summary ==
=== North Atlantic Ocean ===
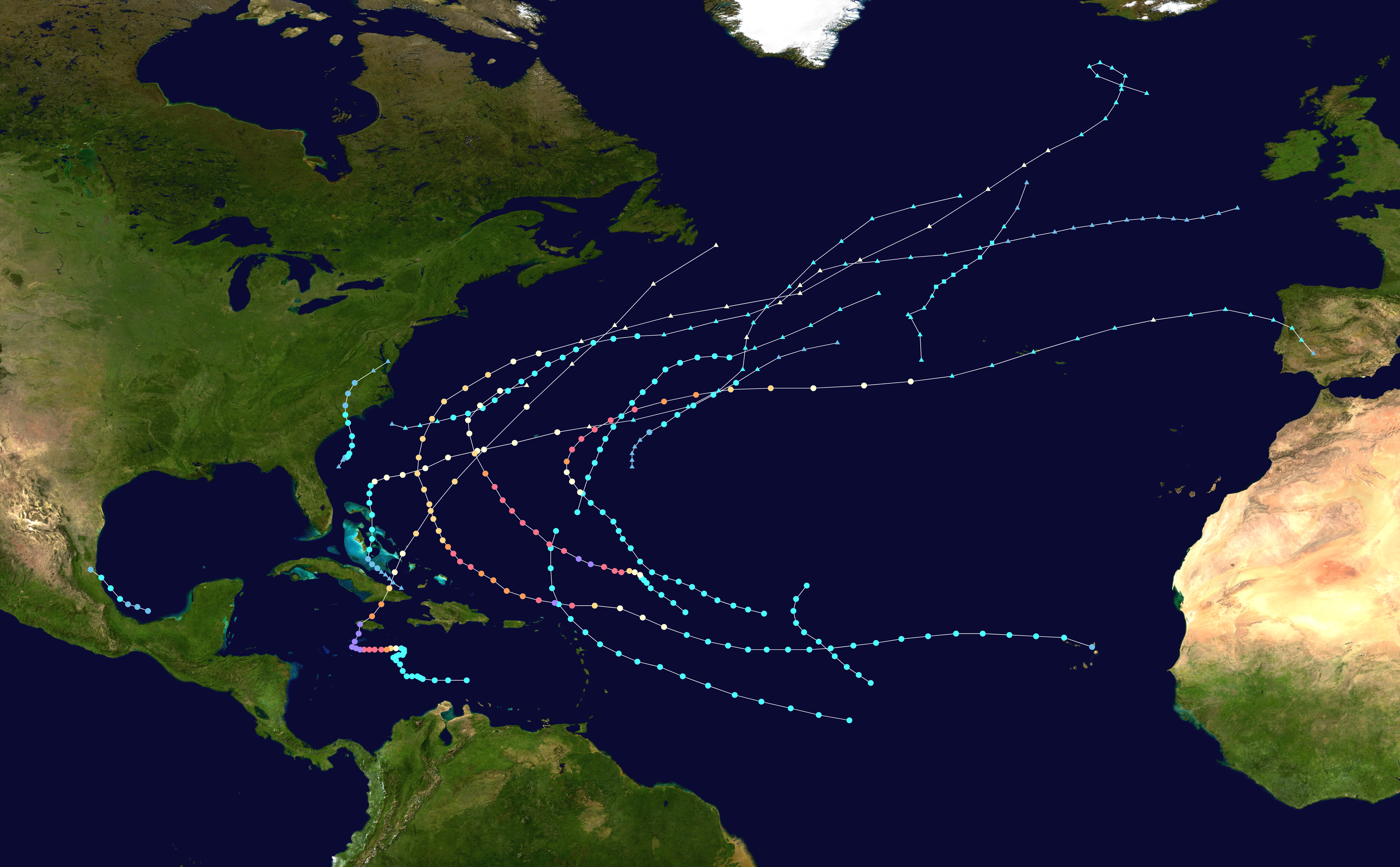
2025 Atlantic hurricane season summary map

Tropical cyclogenesis in the Atlantic Ocean began on June 23 with the formation of Tropical Storm Andrea, three weeks after the official start of the season and three days later than the basin's average first named storm date. This marked the latest start to an Atlantic hurricane season since 2014, when Hurricane Arthur developed on July 1. Andrea remained over open waters in the central Atlantic. The second storm, Tropical Storm Barry, formed in the Bay of Campeche on June 28 and made landfall near Tampico the following day.

Early-season storm formation was limited by several factors. A sprawling North Atlantic High steered tropical waves emerging from West Africa farther south than usual, toward Central America and into the eastern Pacific Ocean. In addition, persistent Saharan dust and the interaction of Kelvin and Rossby waves over the Americas contributed to a hostile environment for tropical development.

The third storm, Tropical Storm Chantal, developed off the Atlantic coast of the Southeastern United States on July 4 and made landfall two days later in South Carolina. All three early-season storms were short-lived, lasting a combined 2.5 days as named storms, well below the 1991-2020 average of 9.1 days through August 2.

After nearly a month of inactivity, Tropical Storm Dexter developed along a stalled front off the North Carolina coast on August 4 before moving out to sea. Hurricane Erin formed near Cape Verde on August 11 and traversed the Atlantic, intensifying into a Category 5 hurricane near the northern Leeward Islands on August 16. It then brought rain, wind, and rip currents to Puerto Rico, Turks and Caicos, the Bahamas, and the East Coast of the United States, while remaining off shore. Shortly after Erin became extratropical, Tropical Storm Fernand formed in the open Atlantic, southeast of Bermuda. Wind shear along with dry air and stable atmospheric conditions inhibited tropical cyclogenesis during the first half of September, the climatological peak of hurricane season. (Note: September 10 is the climatological mid-point of the Atlantic hurricane season.) This highly unusual, nearly three-week long inactive stretch came to an end with the formation of Hurricane Gabrielle on September 17, far to the east of the northern Leeward Islands. The only other season in the weather satellite era to have no named storm active between the end of August and mid-September was the 1992 season. Gabrielle approached Bermuda at Category 4, completed a right turn just southeast of the island, then moved toward the Azores. Next, Hurricane Humberto formed in the central Atlantic on September 24. It ultimately became the second Category 5 hurricane of the season. To its west, Hurricane Imelda formed on September 27. On September 30, the centers of these two systems came within 465 mi (750 km) of each other, closer together than any other two storms in the Atlantic in the satellite era.

On October 7, Tropical Storm Jerry formed in the tropical Atlantic, bringing heavy winds and rains to the Leeward Islands; then came short-lived Subtropical Storm Karen, which formed in the Northern Atlantic on October 10. Next, on October 13, Tropical Storm Lorenzo formed in the open Eastern Atlantic. Later, on October 21, Hurricane Melissa formed in the Caribbean Sea. It became the third Category 5 hurricane of the season, and the third-most-intense Atlantic hurricane by central pressure on record, tied with the 1935 Labor Day hurricane. These three Category 5 hurricanes are the second-most of any season after 2005, the only other season to have more than two Category 5 hurricanes.

Four out of five 2025 Atlantic hurricanes were Category 4 or 5 storms—the highest percentage ever observed in any hurricane season.

=== Eastern & Central Pacific Oceans ===
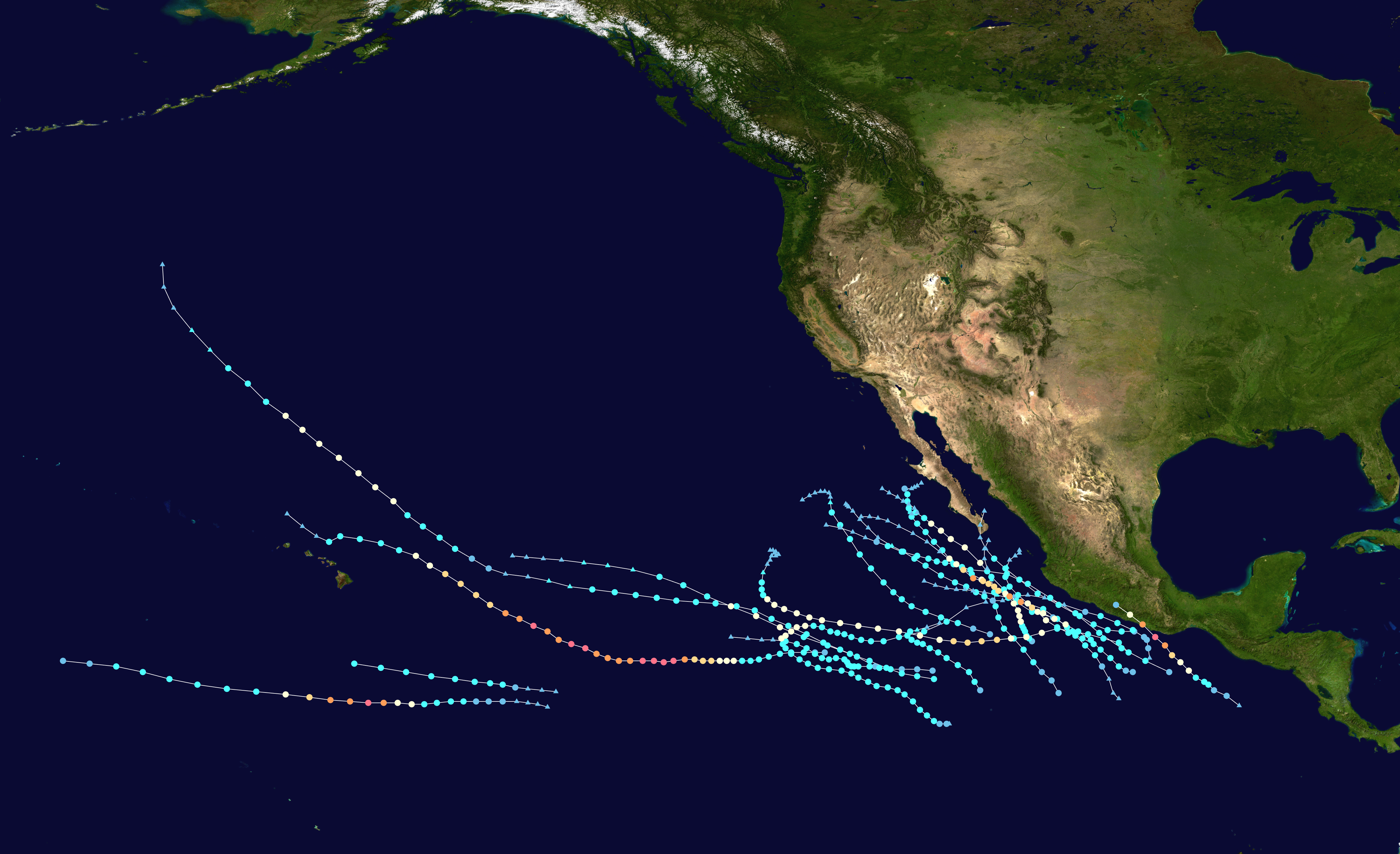
2025 Pacific hurricane season summary map

Activity within the Eastern Pacific began with the formation and development of Tropical Storm Alvin on May 28, two weeks after the official start of the season, but nearly two weeks earlier than the average formation date of the basin's first named storm. Alvin persisted off the coast of Mexico for a few days before degenerating into a remnant low on May 31. The pace of activity quickened in early June. Two storms, Hurricane Barbara and Tropical Storm Cosme, formed on June 8, off the coast of southwestern Mexico. Next came Tropical Storm Dalila, which formed near the coast of southern Mexico on June 13. Hurricane Erick followed early on June 17, off the coast of southern Mexico. Erick was the earliest major hurricane on record to make landfall on either coast of Mexico (Pacific or Atlantic); the previous Pacific coast record was set by Hurricane Kiko on August 26, 1989.

Next came Hurricane Flossie on June 29, which became a Category 3 hurricane off the southwestern coast of Mexico Dalila, Erick, and Flossie became the earliest fourth, fifth, and sixth named storms respectively in the Eastern Pacific since official naming of storms began there in 1960. Tropical activity in the Central Pacific commenced in late July, with the formation of Hurricane Iona on July 27 and Tropical Storm Keli the following day. Both tracked to the south of Island of Hawaiʻi, with Iona crossing the International Date Line. Soon thereafter, Hurricane Gil formed in the open Eastern Pacific on July 31, far south-southwest of the Baja California peninsula. Four tropical cyclones formed during the month of August. The month began with Hurricane Henriette, which formed on August 4 southwest of the Baja California peninsula and eventually moved northeast of Hawaii. It was soon joined by Tropical Storm Ivo on August 6. Developing later in the month were: Tropical Storm Juliette, on August 24; and Hurricane Kiko, on August 31. Each formed well offshore of the southern tip of Baja California. Four systems developed during September: Hurricane Lorena, on September 2; Tropical Storm Mario, on September 11; Hurricane Narda, on September 21; and Hurricane Octave, on September 30. In early October, Hurricane Priscilla formed, ultimately paralleling the Southwestern coast of Mexico, causing rain, high surf, and rip currents. Additionally, heavy rainfail was recorded in the Southwestern United States. Tropical Storm Raymond followed, bringing rainfall to Arizona, particularly Pinal County. In late October, Tropical Storm Sonia formed, tracking westward out to sea.

=== Western Pacific Ocean ===
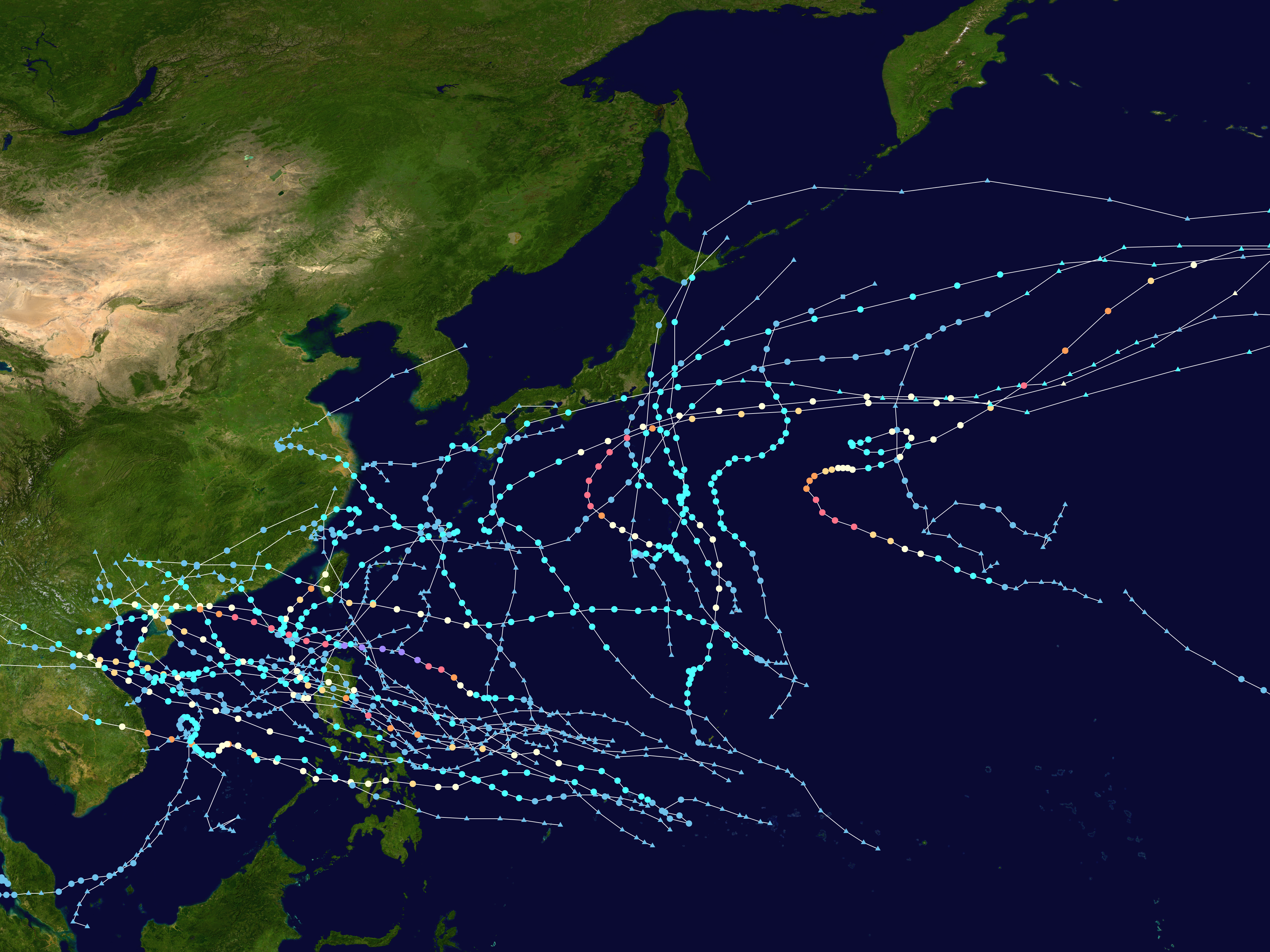
2025 Pacific typhoon season summary map

A short-lived depression formed on February 11 in the South China Sea. It did not strengthen and dissipated into a tropical low late the next day. The system then brought heavy rains to Vietnam, causing flooding. On June 4, a Tropical Disturbance formed assigned as 92W. As it continued westward to the South China Sea, it briefly strengthened into Tropical Depression 01W. The next day it intensified into Tropical Storm Wutip. On the next day, a tropical depression formed, named Auring by PAGASA the next day. On June 12, Wutip had strengthened to a Severe Tropical Storm after getting more organized. Wutip made landfalls on both Hainan and western Guangdong as a minimal typhoon, as estimated by the JTWC. Auring made landfalls on Taiwan and Eastern China. Auring soon dissipated due to land interaction, with Wutip dissipating after making its second landfall. After 6 days of inactivity, 02W formed north of the Northern Mariana Islands. Wind shear soon decreased, and 02W was improving, letting it intensify to Tropical Storm Sepat. It soon degraded in an increasingly unfavorable environment and dissipated near Japan on June 24. 03W formed in the South China Sea and impacted China and Vietnam, killing six people on June 26.

Tropical Depression 04W formed near the Northern Mariana Islands on July 1, and soon strengthened to Tropical Storm Mun, which peaked at 60 mph as a Severe Tropical Storm. No damage occurred from Mun. Whilst Mun was active, a depression formed in the northeastern South China Sea. It soon strengthened into a tropical storm, named Danas by the JMA or Bising by PAGASA, shortly before it exited the PAR. Danas rapidly intensified into a typhoon before making landfall in Budai in southwestern Taiwan as a Category 3-equivalent storm. It exited to the north of Taiwan and turned west, making two landfalls as a tropical storm in Zhejiang. Following Danas was Severe Tropical Storm Nari, which took a similar track to Mun, but made landfall as a weakening storm in Hokkaido. At the same time, a depression formed in the East China Sea, designated Tropical by the JMA but subtropical by the JTWC. It was initially expected to strengthen slightly, but made landfall over Kyushu without reaching storm status. The JTWC recognized a fast-moving tropical storm that formed near the Ogasawara Islands on July 15, unofficially making a landfall on Japan the same day. It then dissipated without being recognized by the JMA, mostly due to its potentially incomplete low-level circulation. The next day, a tropical depression formed east of the Philippines, named Crising by PAGASA. The JMA soon upgraded it to a tropical storm, naming it Wipha. The JTWC followed suit the next day, and the JMA declared it a severe tropical storm on July 19. It made landfall in southern China on July 20, after extreme preparations were taken, including Wind Signal No.10, the highest possible state in Hong Kong. The JTWC estimated it as a Typhoon at landfall. Wipha emerged into the Gulf of Tonkin and briefly restrengthened before landfall in Vietnam. It dissipated the next day. Within the next few days, three more systems formed, Francisco, Co-may, and Krosa. Francisco formed east of Kyushu Island, and moved westward before degrading into a remnant low before making a landfall due to a Fujiwhara effect with Co-may, which formed west of northern Luzon and turned northeastward due to Francisco, making landfall as a Typhoon before degrading into a depression. After Francisco dissipated, Co-may began to restrengthen near where Francisco formed. It fluctuated between Storm and Depression status on July 27 and 28. It slightly strengthened before it made landfall near Shanghai. Flooding from the storm caused 55 deaths. Meanwhile, Krosa formed near Guam and strengthened to a Typhoon, before dry air intrusion caused it to weaken to a tropical storm, and fluctuated in intensity before passing near Japan. Behind that, Bailu became a short-lived tropical storm.

To start off August, several tropical depressions formed which did not intensify, including a crossover of Iona from the Central Pacific. Also there was an unnumbered, 14W, 15W, Fabian, and 17W, all depressions. While those formed, Podul moved toward Taiwan and made landfall as a Typhoon, crossing into China as a tropical storm. Following that was Lingling, which made landfall in northern Kagoshima before dissipating. Another depression formed near the Philippines on August 22, soon upgraded to Tropical Storm Kajiki. It began quick intensification as it moved westward through the northern South China Sea and approached Vietnam as a Typhoon, or a Category 2, becoming the strongest system of the season so far. After Kajiki, there was Tropical Storm Nongfa, which had a similar track to Kajiki.

The month of September began with Tropical Storm Peipah on September 2. Typhoon Tapah formed three days later, making landfall in Taishan, Guangdong, China, as a Category 1 typhoon on September 8, killing 12 people. During the peak of the season, three tropical cyclones formed: Mitag, Ragasa, and Neoguri. Typhoon Ragasa became the first super typhoon of the season, as well as the first Category 5 typhoon recorded in the basin, making it the latest Category 5 typhoon since Typhoon Hinnamnor in 2022. Typhoon Neoguri strengthened into a Category 4 tropical cyclone in fresh waters without affecting some areas. Typhoon Bualoi formed on September 22 near the Philippines. Before weakening, Neoguri strengthened into an unusually high-latitude Category 4 typhoon near the 40°N, making it one of the strongest unusually high-latitude cyclones on record. Meanwhile, Bualoi caused extensive damages and losses of life in the Philippines and Vietnam.

October began with the formation of Matmo, Halong, and Nakri, one of which became a very strong typhoon. Typhoon Matmo caused extensive flooding in the Philippines and Thailand, resulting in at least 23 deaths, and the damage caused by the storm is $2.24 billion which became the second costliest storm this year. The month ended with the formation of Typhoon Kalmaegi, which made landfall on November 4 as a Category 2 cyclone in the central Philippines, where it caused additional flooding and at least 224 deaths, with several more reported in Vietnam and Thailand by its dissolution on November 7.

November began with the formation of Typhoon Fung-wong, which hit the northern Philippines as a Category 3 cyclone on the evening of November 9, causing extensive damage, and killing at least 33 people. Wilma was the last tropical cyclone on December until it dissipated.

=== North Indian Ocean ===
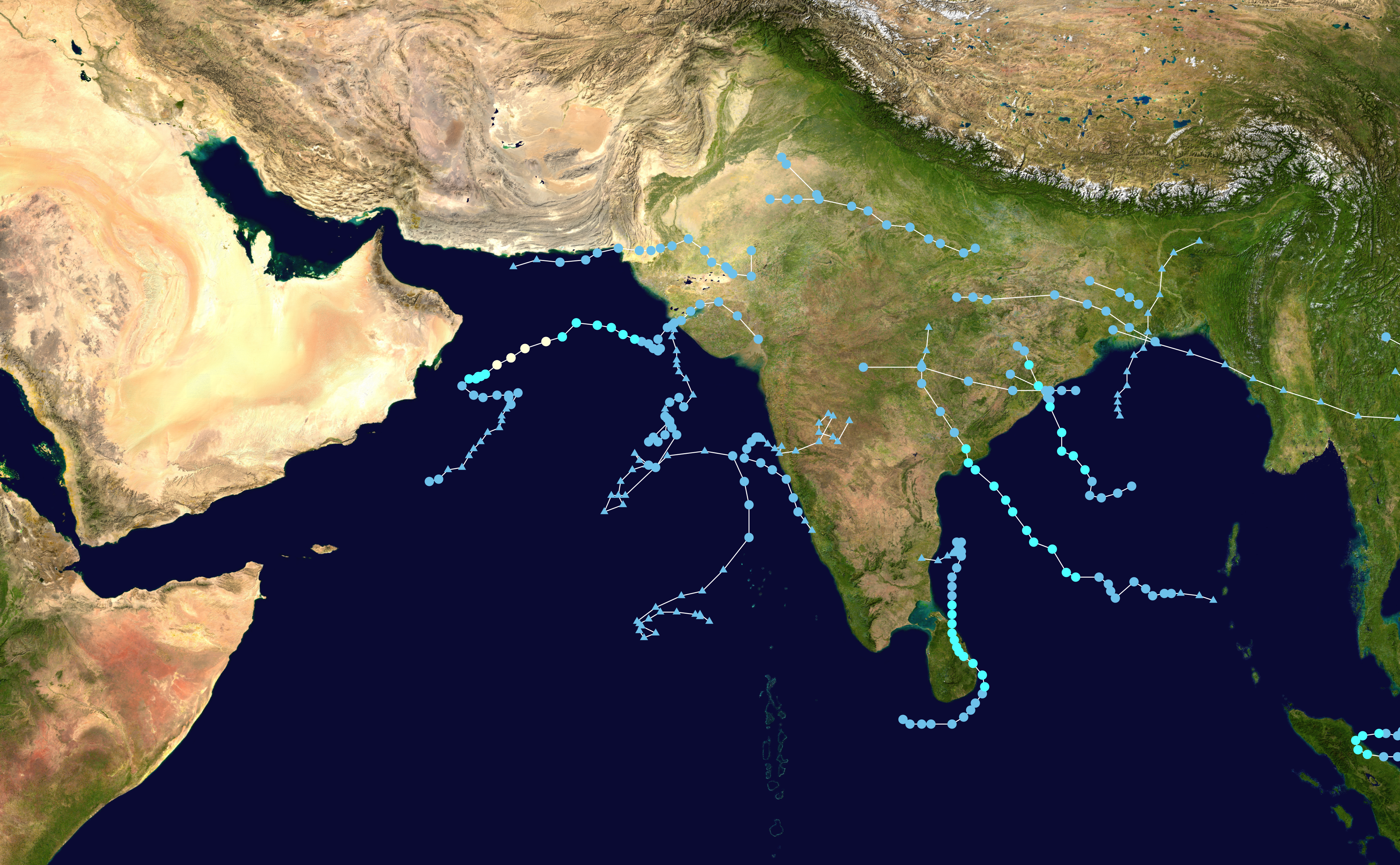
2025 North Indian Ocean cyclone season summary map

A Depression formed in the Arabian Sea off the coast of Konkan, named ARB 01. It made a landfall on India soon after, bringing heavy rain to the region after degrading into a tropical low. It peaked with 30 mph 3-min winds and a minimum barometric pressure of 997 hPa (mbar). On May 29, Depression BOB 01 formed near West Bengal. It strengthened into a Deep Depression three hours later on the IMD scale. It made landfall on the border of West Bengal and Bangladesh 6 hours later at its peak of 35 mph 3-min winds and a minimum barometric pressure of 988 hPa (mbar). It weakened and dissipated over Bangladesh over the next 36 hours, bringing heavy rain to the region. 65 people died from the resulting landslides and flooding.

After a lull in activity, Depression BOB 02 formed over West Bengal on July 14 from a well-marked low that moved inland a day prior. The next day, another depression was designated LAND 01. It quickly dissipated after forming over Northwestern India. BOB 02 dissipated but soon regenerated, causing it to be assigned a new name, LAND 03, despite there being no recorded evidence of a LAND 02. Soon after it dissipated for good, a new Depression emerged in the extreme northern Bay of Bengal, designated as BOB 04, but, similar to BOB 02/LAND 03, there was no evidence of a BOB 03. It moved inland and soon dissipated, but brought extreme rain and flooding to the affected areas. The remnants of Wipha crossed the North Indian basin and concentrated into depression BOB 04, which brought torrential rainfall to the Kolkata area, causing many parts of the city to become waterlogged. It became the costliest North Indian Ocean cyclone season on record, surpassing the 2020 season.

=== South-West Indian Ocean ===
==== January–June ====
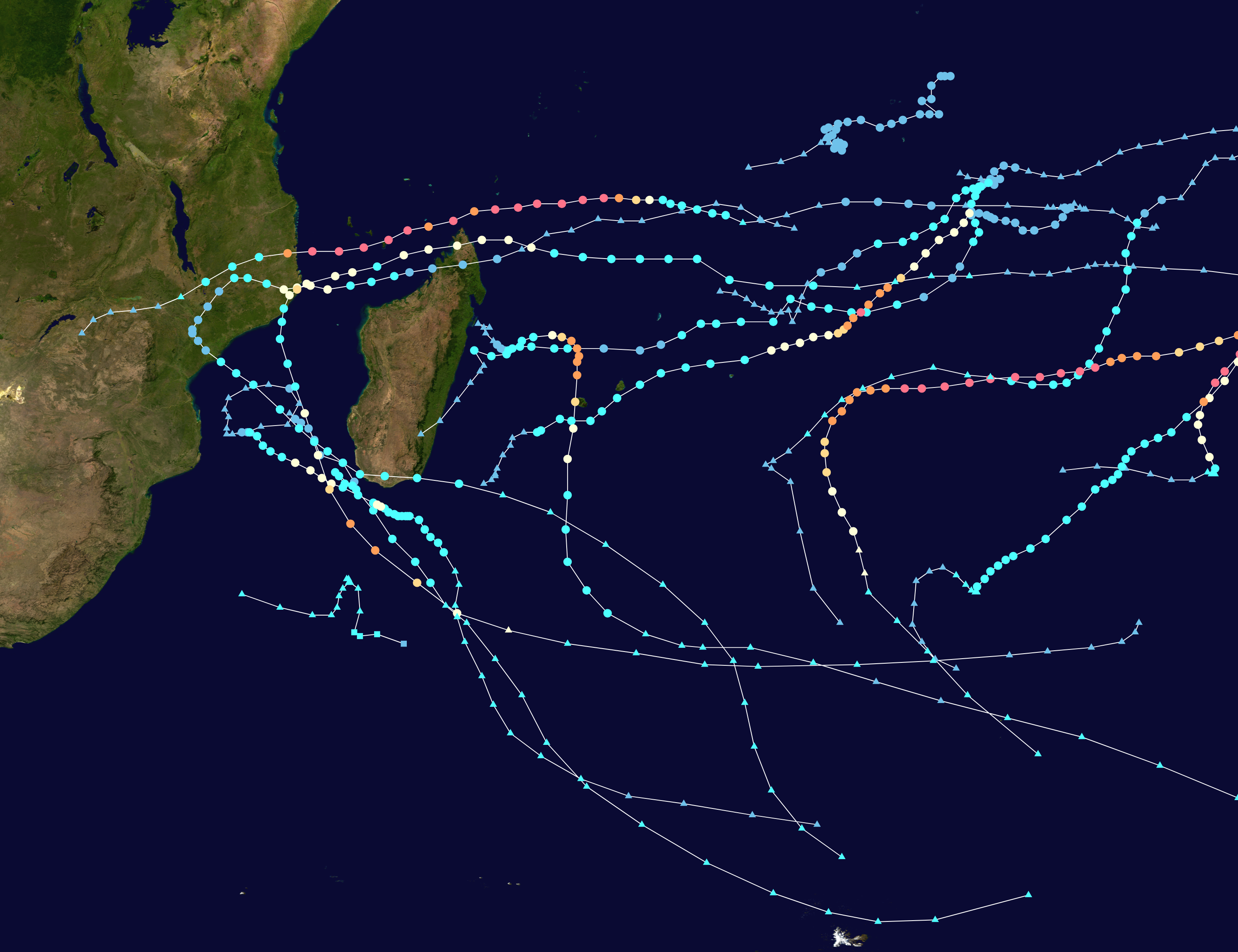
2024–2025 South-West Indian Ocean cyclone season summary map

Dikeledi formed on January 6, gradually intensifying over the next four days until making landfall in Northern Madagascar as a Category 2 equivalent cyclone on January 11. The cyclone weakened to a tropical storm south of Mayotte before rapidly strengthening back to Category 2 intensity, making landfall near Nacala at that strength on January 13. In late January, two tropical cyclones formed; one of them, moderate Tropical Storm Faida, brought heavy rainfall to Madagascar on February 5, while the other, moderate Tropical Storm Elvis, brought rain on the South of Madagascar in the end of January. After Faida dissipated, Tropical Cyclone Vince entered the basin from the Australian region on February 4. Four days later, it became the most intense cyclone of the season and the first very intense tropical cyclone since Cyclone Freddy two years before. At February 12, Vince had transitioned to being extratropical. At the same day, Taliah had entered the basin fluctuating between a moderate tropical storm and a strong tropical storm before becoming a post-tropical cyclone at February 18. Six days later, Garance and Honde had formed, Garance receiving its name the day after. Garance intensified rapidly into an Intense Tropical Cyclone, making landfall at Réunion at February 28 as a Category 2. Honde brought heavy rainfall to Mozambique and then southern Madagascar as a Category 1. Jude formed as a disturbance south of the Chagos Islands on March 6. It intensified at March 8, receiving its name. Ivone entered the basin on March 8 and on the same day intensified to a Moderate Tropical Storm and received its name. Jude made landfall in Mozambique as a Category 1 at March 10. Courtney from the Australian region entered the basin on March 29, becoming an intense tropical cyclone. After nearly a month of inactivity, on April 20 Subtropical storm Kanto was named reaching a peak intensity of 75 km/h (10 minute sustained) winds with a central pressure of 993 hPa. This was the first subtropical storm named by Météo-France, which added the subtropical cyclone category starting with this cyclone season.

==== July–December ====
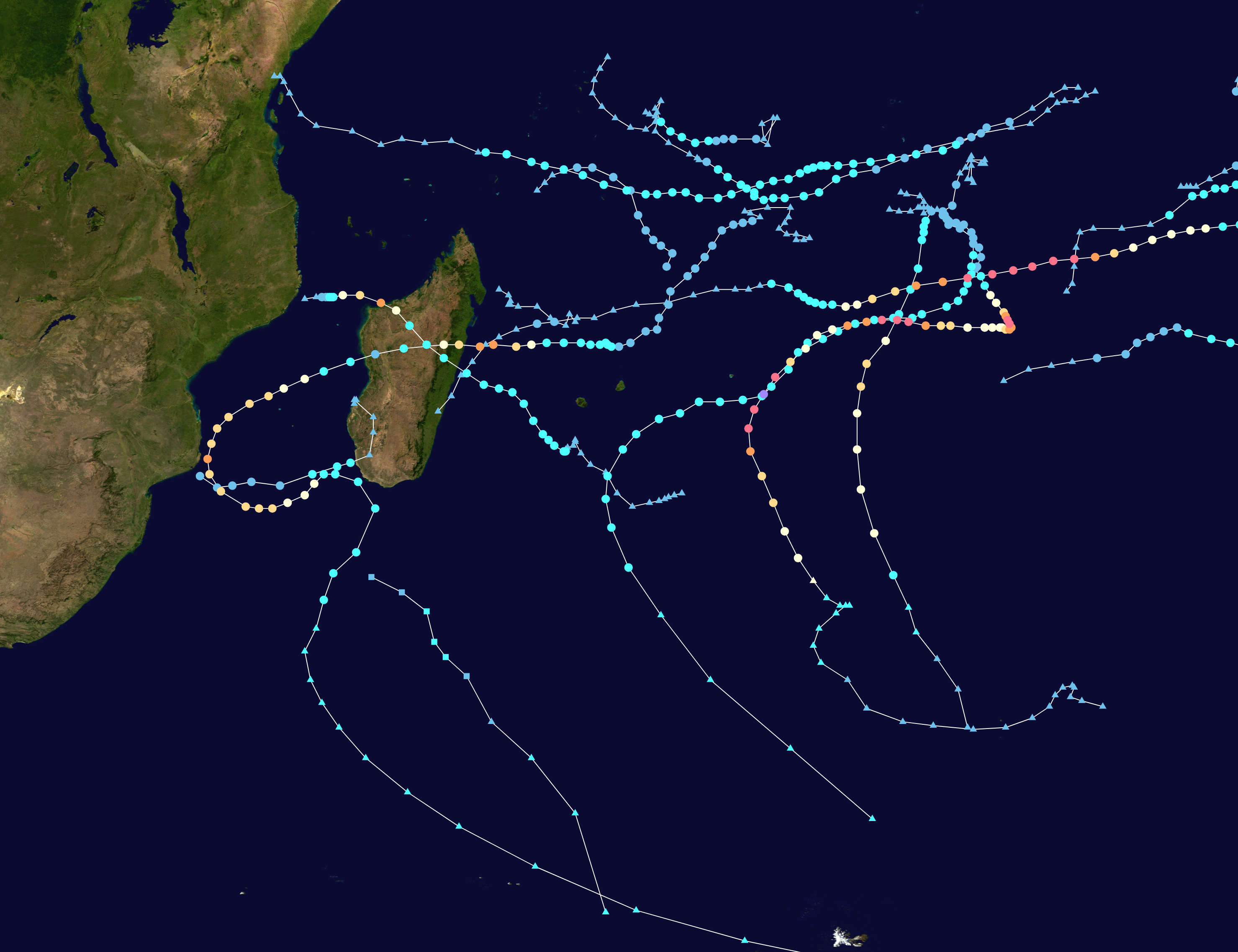
2025–2026 South-West Indian Ocean cyclone season summary map

The season began with the crossover of a tropical low from the Australian basin on July 16. The low was designated Tropical Depression 01 by Météo-France, while the JTWC designated the depression as Tropical Storm 01S a little later. The system did not strengthen and dissipated 2 days later without affecting land.

On August 7, a tropical disturbance formed well north of the Mascarenes. Later that day it was upgraded to a tropical depression then subsequently named Awo that evening as it strengthened into a Moderate Tropical Storm. Awo was the first named storm to form in August within the South-West Indian Ocean basin since Severe Tropical Storm Aline in 1969, though Severe Tropical Storm Tony did enter the basin during August in 1979. Awo only briefly survived, encountering high shear and dissipating the next day. On the 7 September, Météo–France started monitoring a disturbance south of Diego Garcia, on the 9 September. Briefly on 9 September, it intensified into a tropical depression. The system was then classified as a Moderate Tropical Storm and named Blossom, becoming the second named storm of the season. Blossom maintained its intensity in a marginal environment, before degenerating into a remnant low–pressure area on 11 September. On 17 October, a low–pressure area formed near Diego Garcia and was marked by Météo-France as the fourth Zone of Disturbed Weather of the season.

On 17 October, a low–pressure area formed near Diego Garcia and was marked by Météo-France as the fourth Zone of Disturbed Weather of the season, the fourth off-season system of the season. After strengthening into a Moderate Tropical Storm, it was named Chenge. Heading westward, the cyclone further strengthened into a Severe Tropical Storm of October 22 before weakening. On October 25, Chenge degenerated into a remnant low off the coast of Tanzania.

=== Australian Region ===
==== January–June ====
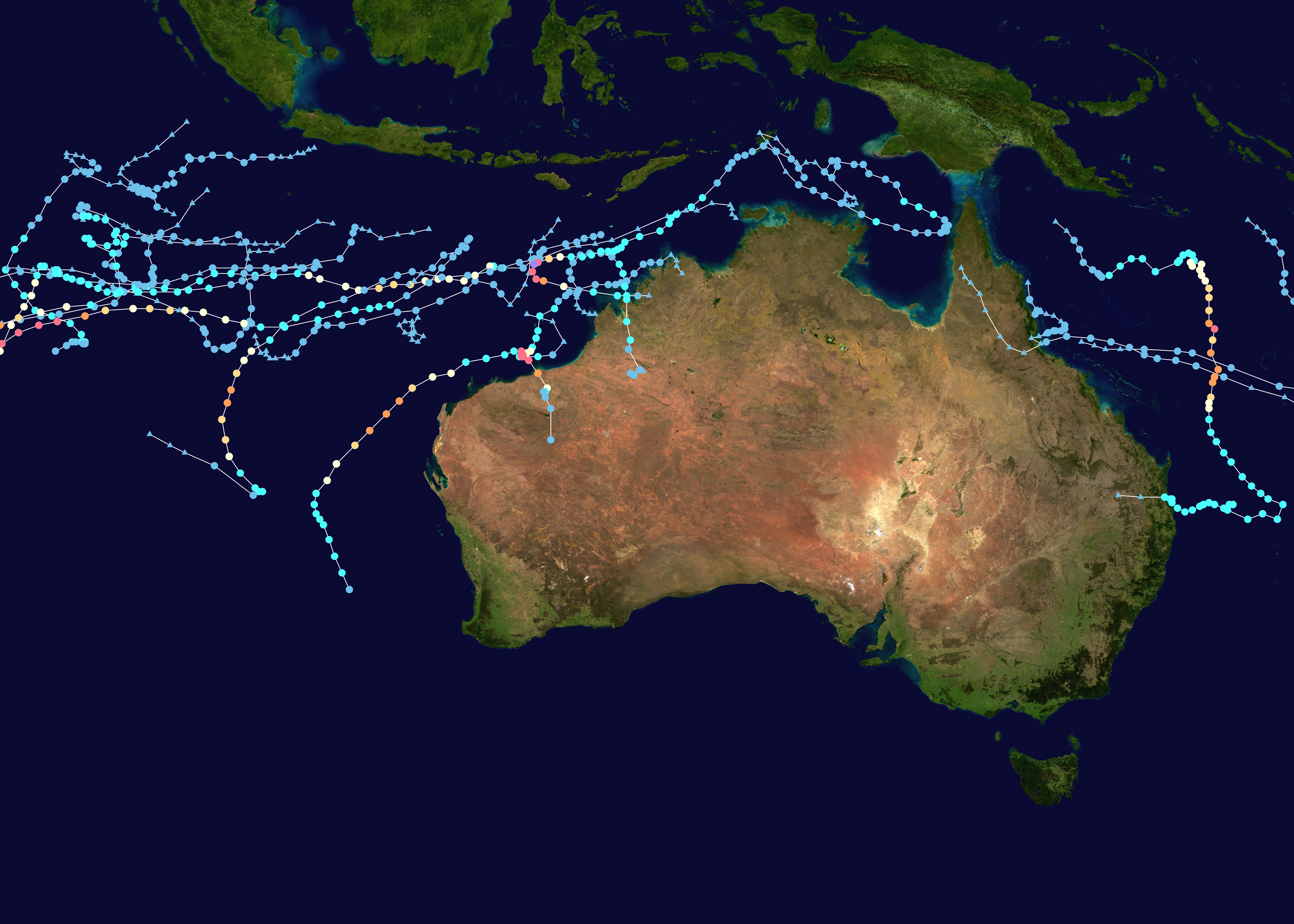
2024–2025 Australian region cyclone season summary map

The season officially started on 1 November 2024. On 14 November, the Bureau of Meteorology (BoM) noted that a tropical low may form west of Sumatra. A westerly wind shear enhanced the disturbance's development. Despite moderate to high wind shear displacing deep convection, the tropical low further developed and the Joint Typhoon Warning Center (JTWC) issued a tropical cyclone formation alert. On 28 November, the BoM named Tropical Cyclone Robyn. The storm officially peaked as a high-end tropical storm before increasing wind shear caused the storm to dissipate. On 4 December, Tropical Low 04U formed off the coast of Java and headed west before dissipating on 11 December. Unfortunately, the disturbance caused landslides and floods, killing eleven people and leaving seven missing. The rest of December had Tropical Lows 02U, 06U, 07U, and 08U. Tropical Low 07U formed southeast of the Cocos Islands and JTWC designated it as a tropical storm. 08U later became Category 3 Cyclone Dikeledi in the Southwest Indian Ocean.

The first half of January had Tropical Cyclone 09U and Tropical Low 10U. The latter half had Sean, 13U, Taliah, and Vince. On 17 January, the BoM designated Tropical Low 11U, which absorbed 10U, and later named Sean on 19 January. A day later, the storm rapidly intensified to a Category 4 major cyclone on the Australian cyclone scale, possessing a distinct eye and intense winds. Sean dissipated a couple days later. The cyclone caused heavy rainfall and gale-force winds across portions of Western Australia. A record amount of rain fell in Karratha, with 274.4 mm recorded within 24 hours on 20 January. Tropical Low 13U briefly tracked along the coast of Queensland and flooding killed a 63-year-old woman. On 31 January, the BoM designated Tropical Lows 14U and 15U, which were later named Taliah and Vince. After dealing with moderate wind shear, on 3 February, Taliah peaked as a Category 3 severe tropical cyclone on the Australian cyclone scale and Category 2 on the SSHWS scale. Taliah exited the basin on 12 February. Vince was named on 2 February and also intensified to a Category 3 on the Australian cyclone scale before exiting BoM area of responsibility on 4 February. February started with Tropical Lows 16U and 19U, though both disturbances exited the basin and entered the Fiji Meteorological Service area of responsibility. Meanwhile, the BoM designated Tropical Low 18U on 7 February, which was named Zelia on 11 February. Two days later, Zelia underwent rapid intensification due to warm sea surface temperatures and relatively low wind shear. At 00:00 UTC 13 February, Zelia intensified to a Category 4 severe tropical cyclone and later to Category 5 intensity. Afterward, the cyclone stalled and underwent an eyewall replacement cycle (EWRC), which ended its rapid intensification phase. Radar imagery showed an EWRC, which was later completed before landfall near De Grey, northeast of Port Hedland. On 18 February, the Bureau of Meteorology designated Tropical Low 21U in the eastern side of the Indian Ocean. BOM later named the system Tropical Cyclone Bianca. On 20 February, a tropical low was spotted by the Bureau of Meteorology in the Coral Sea. The disturbance, initially designated by the agency as 22U, was noted to likely develop into a tropical cyclone over the next several days. Two days later, BOM upgraded the system to a category 1, with the name Alfred being assigned to it. On 25 February, Bianca peaked as a Category 4 severe tropical cyclone on the Australian cyclone scale and Category 3 on the SSHWS scale. Afterward, increasing wind shear and cooler sea surface temperatures caused the storm to rapidly weaken, dissipating on 27 February. Over the next couple of days, Alfred continued to gradually move to the east, and was upgraded to a Category 2 tropical cyclone in the Australian scale at 16:00 AEST on 24 February. As Alfred turned south, it intensified to Category 3 status on 26 February at 22:00 AEST. The next day, the BOM further upgraded Alfred to a Category 4 cyclone, with a small eye appearing on visible satellite imagery. Later that night, an eyewall replacement cycle (ERC) occurred, prompting Alfred to fluctuate between Categories 3 and 4 on 1 March, before further weakening down to a Category 1 the following day. The cyclone then restrengthened slightly to Category 2 status by 3 March, before being downgraded to Category 1 intensity on 8 March. Alfred made landfall at Moreton Island on 01:00 AEST 8 March as a Category 1 tropical cyclone, and was downgraded to a tropical low five hours later.

Tropical Low 23U formed on 4 March before exiting the basin on 8 March. The system later intensified into Tropical Storm Ivone in the South-West Indian Ocean. Tropical Cyclone 25U formed on 17 March before dissipating on 21 March. Tropical Low 27U formed on 22 March and strengthened into Tropical Cyclone Courtney three days later. Afterward, Courtney intensified to a Category 5 cyclone on the Australian cyclone scale before entering the South-West Indian Ocean on 29 March. Tropical Cyclone Dianne formed near North Australia on 28 March and made landfall near Derby on 29 March. On 8 April, Tropical Low 29U formed in the Arafura Sea. Three days later, JTWC designated Tropical Cyclone 29S. Later on 15 April, 29S was designated as Errol by BoM. Shortly after the designation, the cyclone explosively intensified to a powerful Category 5 severe tropical cyclone. Tropical Low 30U formed in the Arafura Sea on 16 April. On 18 April, JTWC designated 30U as 31P. It was expected to strengthen, but wind shear soon caused it to dissipate on 23 April.

On 9 May 2025, Tropical Low 33U formed near Papua New Guinea. During 11 May, this system was upgraded to a tropical storm by the JTWC and designated 32P. 33U dissipated the next day. On 14 May, Tropical Low 34U formed near the Solomon Islands. It meandered around the southern Solomon Sea but dissipated the next day.

==== July–December ====
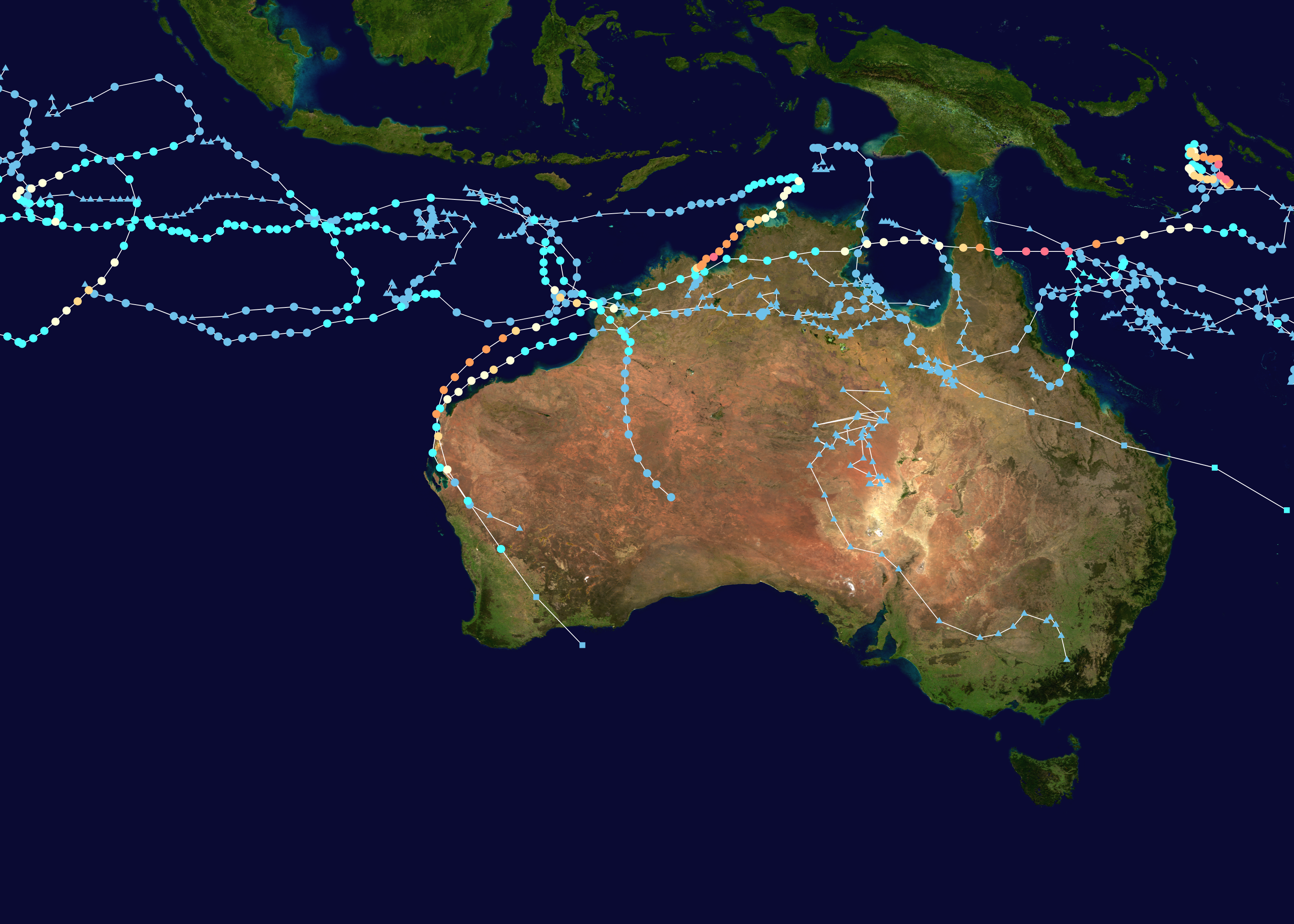
2025-2026 Australian region cyclone season summary map

The season began with a tropical low in TCWC Jakarta's area of responsibility on July 15. It moved into the South-West Indian Ocean a day later. Then came a tropical low on August 2, which dissipated on August 5. Another tropical low formed on September 9, meandering around the ocean, and dissipated on September 12. On October 19, yet another low formed, it did not strengthen, it dissipated on October 22. All three storms were in the TCWC Jakarta’s responsibility. Tropical Low 02U formed on November 14. Later that day, Tropical Low 02U was upgraded into a category 1 cyclone, naming it Fina. Fina would then meander around the Timor and Arafura seas, strengthening steadily in the process. After making a landfall near Darwin, Northern Territory as a Category 2 Cyclone, Fina exited land into the Van Diemen and Beagle Gulfs, eventually reentering the Timor Sea. That is when Fina began rapidly intensifying into a Category 4 Cyclone, and making landfall in the Cambridge Bay area at 15:00 UTC as a Category 3 cyclone. Fina would soon dissipate on the 25th.

On the 10th of December, another low developed in TCWC Jakarta's area of responsibility. This one, however, would actually form, and be named Bakung on December 12th. Bakung was located in an area with very low wind shear, and consequentially would then intensify into a Category 4 cyclone by December 14. Wind shear would then increase again, causing Bakung to weaken for 2 or so days. wind shear would ease, allowing Bakung to reintensify to a Category 3 on December 17th. Wind shear would then increase again, tearing Bakung apart, and making it dissipate on the 18th of November.

While Bakung was active, another low formed on the 11th, however it would lay relatively dormant for 6 days. It would eventually begin to intensify on the 17th. The JTWC would declare a TCFA on December 19th. It would then be named Grant on December 23rd, and it would pass near the Cocos island on the 25th. Grant would then leave the basin on the 27th of December.

Around the time Grant was leaving the basin, another low would form and concentrate on the 26th, and on the 29th, both the JTWC and BOM would upgrade it to Category 1, naming it Hayley. Hayley would begin rapid intensification on the same day, attaining Category 4 intensity the next day. It developed a short lived eye on the 30th, however it would begin to weaken slightly into a Category 3. Hayley then slammed into the Dampier Peninsula late that day, moving into the King Sound for about 2 and a half hours before moving onto the main piece of Western Australia around 2:30 UTC. Hayley would then rapidly weaken, and dissipate on the 31st.

=== South Pacific Ocean ===
==== January–June ====
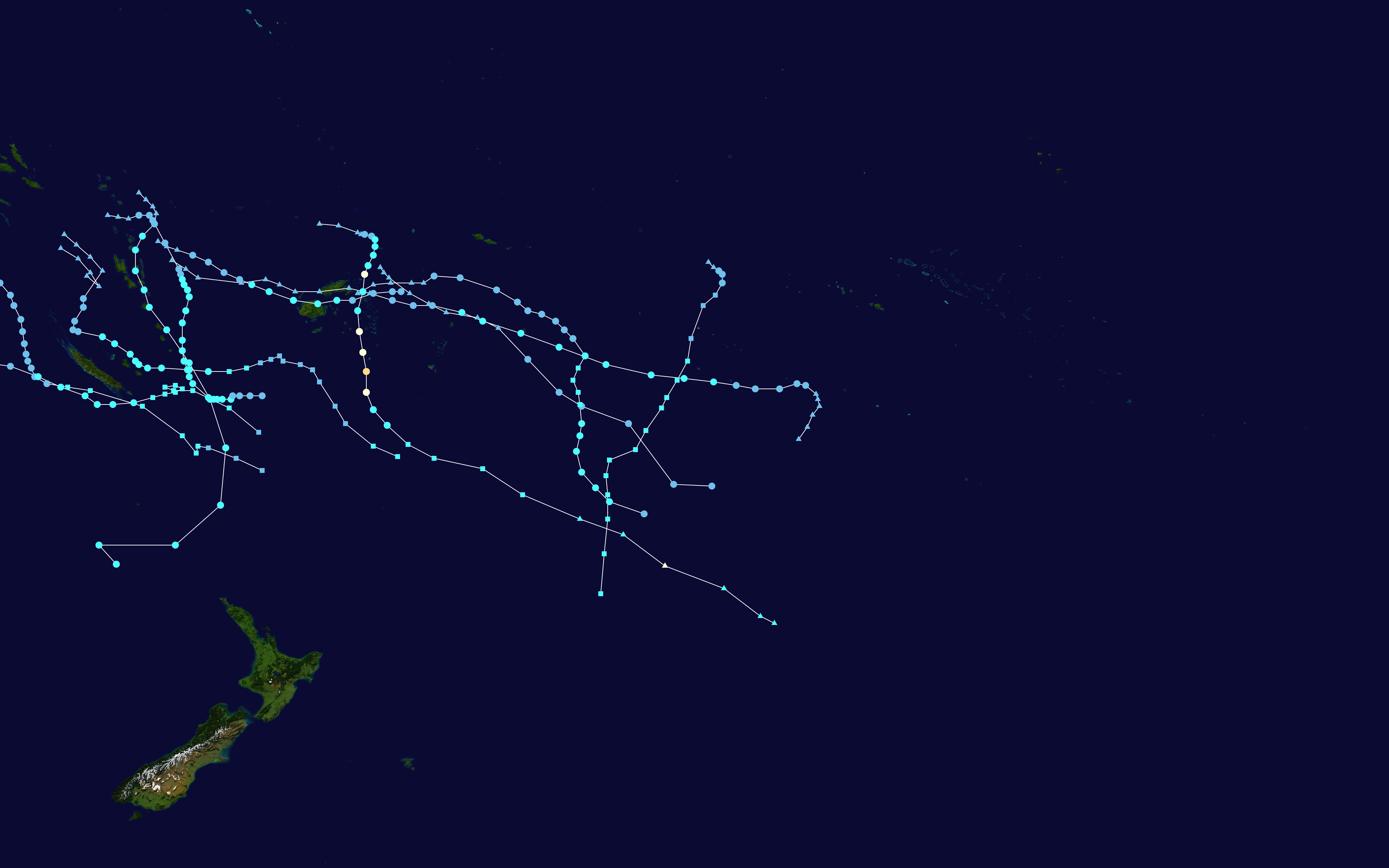
2024–2025 South Pacific cyclone season summary map

Tropical Disturbance 03F was designated on January 5 and stayed out to sea moving southeastwards before dissipating three days later.

The first named storm of the season, Tropical Cyclone Pita formed on January 9. The storm dropped heavy rains that resulted in flooding across Samoa and Fiji, isolated flooding occurred in the latter nation including the collapse of a bridge.

After a long pause in activity, two Tropical Depressions (05F and 07F) were monitored in early and mid-February. 06F however failed to reach Tropical Depression status. Tropical Depression 08F were monitored later that month. On February 22 Tropical Cyclone Rae developed passing just east of Fiji. On February 23, the Fiji Meteorological Service named Tropical Cyclone Rae. Rae peaked on February 25 with winds of 110 km/h and 975 hpa. A few days later on February 24, Tropical Cyclone Seru formed north of most islands of Vanuatu. Seru peaked with 110 km/h and 980 hpa on February 25. Rae turned post-tropical on February 26 and Seru degenerated into a remnant low on March 1, respectively.

After a second, even more significant lull in activity, Tropical Cyclone Tam was named on April 14 by the Fiji Meteorological Service. It intensified into a deep subtropical cyclone by April 16, bringing severe weather and flooding to northern New Zealand and causing 5 deaths in New South Wales in Australia.

==== July–December ====
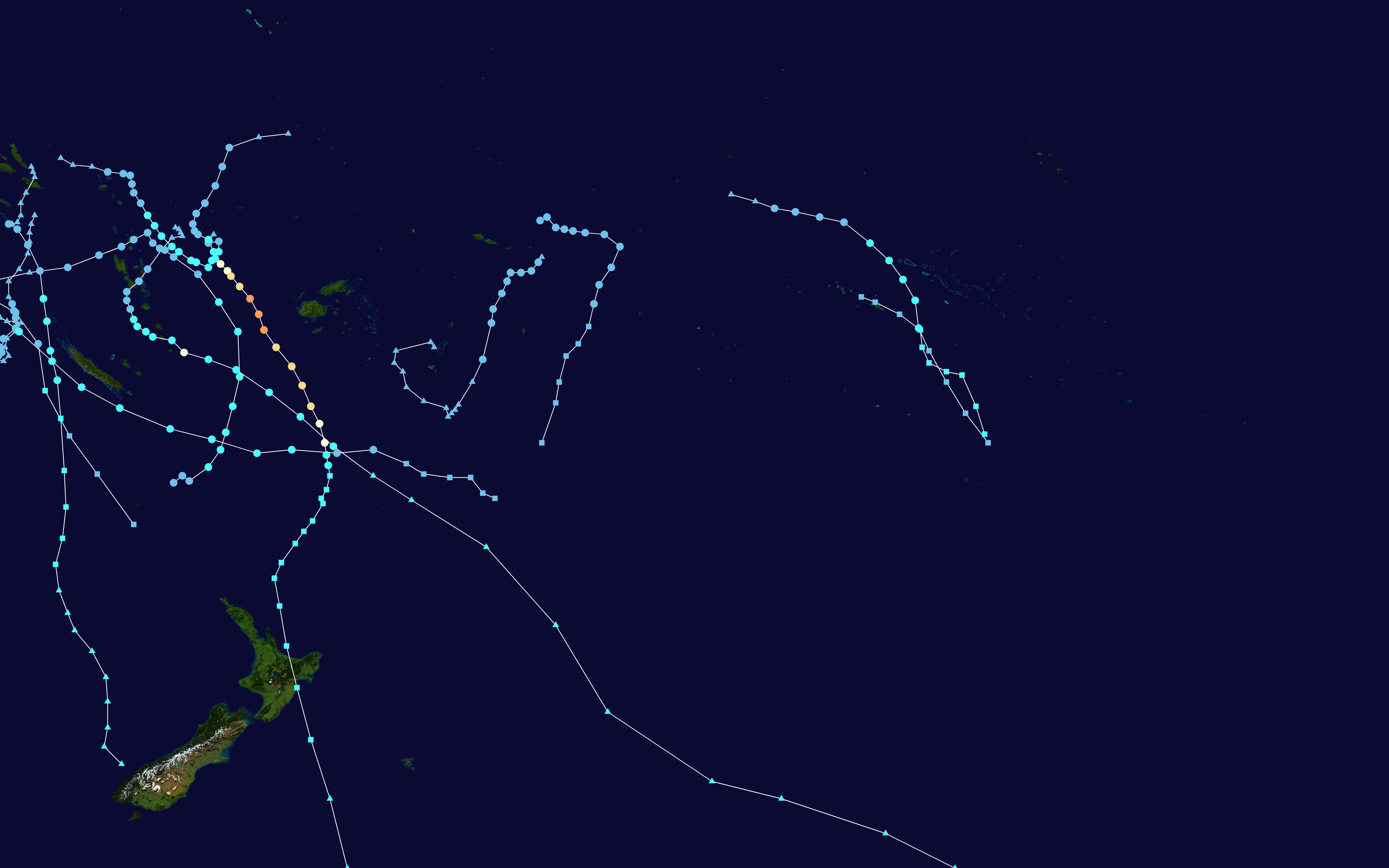
2025–2026 South Pacific cyclone season summary map

Tropical Disturbance 01F was the first tropical cyclone of the season.

=== South Atlantic Ocean ===
Track map of Cyclone Revegoca, the sole South Atlantic tropical cyclone of 2025

== Systems ==
=== January ===
Cyclone Vince

January was unusually active, with twelve systems forming and seven storms getting named. The month started off in the South-West Indian Ocean with Cyclone Dikeledi, which intensified into a major cyclone before it made two landfalls at Antsiranana, Madagascar and Nampula Province, Mozambique, Cyclone Elvis and Cyclone Faida also formed but was downgraded into a depression by MFR in post-storm analysis. Meanwhile, short-lived Cyclone Pita formed on January 6, affecting some islands in the South Pacific basin. Weeks later, in the Australian basin, Cyclone Sean developed on January 17. Sean rapidly intensified into a Category 3-tropical cyclone, marking it the second major tropical cyclone of the year after Dikeledi. Cyclone Taliah and Cyclone Vince formed as well, with the latter rapidly intensifying into a Very Intense Tropical Cyclone in the South-West Indian Ocean, making it the strongest cyclone this month.

Tropical cyclones formed in January 2025
Storm name	Dates active	Max wind km/h (mph)	Pressure (hPa)	Areas affected	Damage (USD)	Deaths	Refs
Dikeledi	December 30 – January 17	175 (110)	945	Madagascar, Mayotte, Mozambique, Comoros, Europa Island	>$20 million	9	
02F	December 31 – January 2	Unknown	1006	None	None	None	
03F	January 5–8	Unknown	997	Samoa, Niue	None	None	
09U	January 6–12	75 (45)	1000	None	None	None	
Pita	January 6–12	65 (40)	995	Tonga, Niue, Cook Islands	None	None	
10U	January 13–17	30 (15)	1006	None	None	None	
Sean	January 17–22	175 (110)	945	Broome, Port Hedland, Western Australia	None	None	
Elvis	January 24–31	85 (50)	990	Mozambique, Madagascar	None	None	
Faida	January 28 – February 4	55 (35)	998	Mascarene Islands, Madagascar	None	None	
13U	January 29 – February 1	55 (35)	999	Queensland	None	1	
Vince	January 31 – February 11	220 (140)	925	Rodrigues, Île Amsterdam	None	None	
Taliah	January 31 – February 18	140 (85)	965	None	None	None	
05F	January 31 – February 5	Unknown	1000	Loyalty Islands, Vanuatu	None	None	

=== February ===
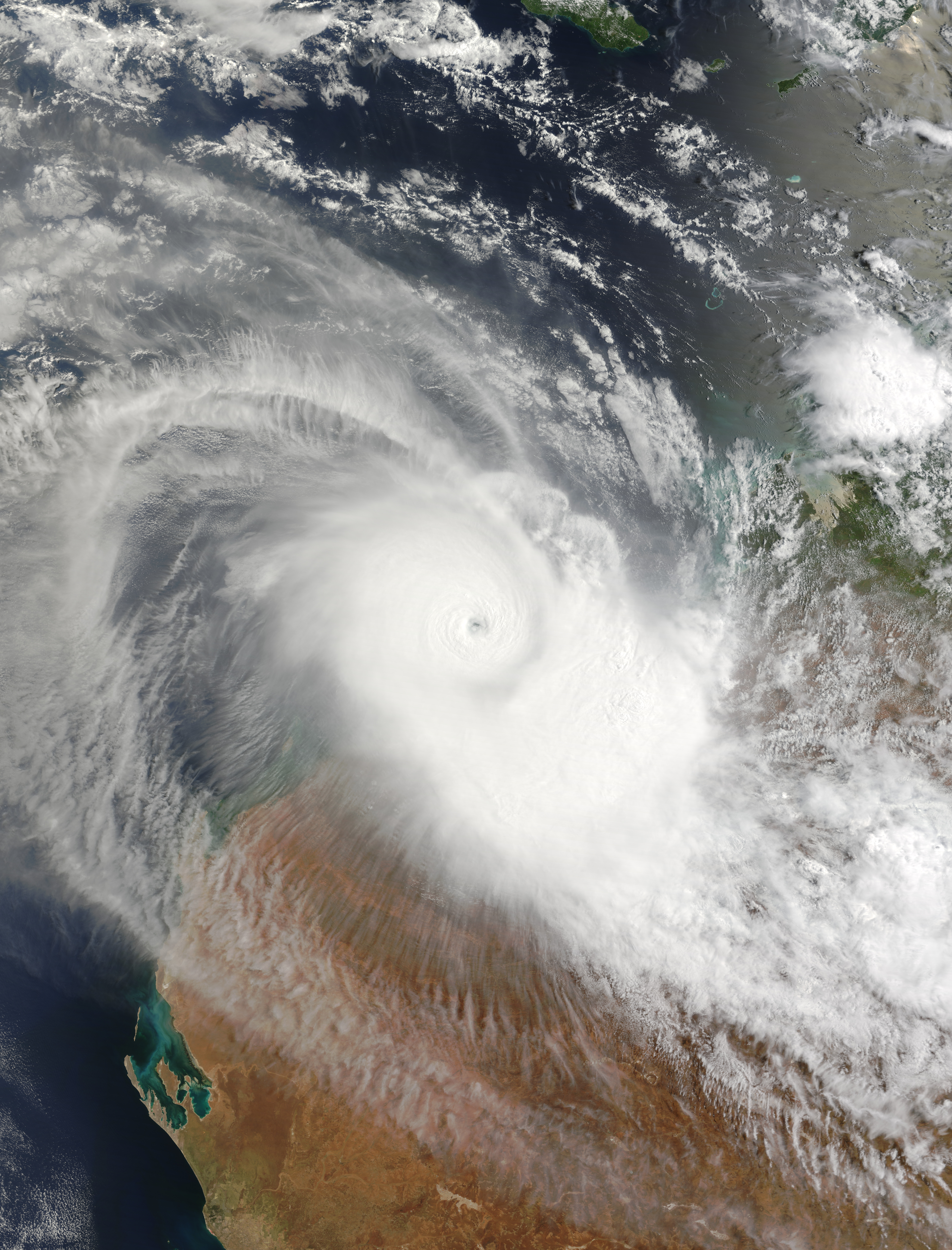
Cyclone Zelia

February was extremely active. It was the most active month, and one of the third-most active months in any given year on record, with twelve systems forming and seven storms getting named. A total of seven tropical cyclones reached Category 3 strength or higher, the highest number since records began in 2003. The month started off active with five systems forming in January and then persisting into February: Faida, 13U, Vince, Taliah, and 05F. Cyclone Zelia formed on February 7 near the Kimberley region, and rapidly intensified into a Category 5 severe tropical cyclone six days later; it then made landfall near De Grey in Australia as a Category 4 tropical cyclone. A weak depression briefly existed in the South China Sea. Two tropical cyclones formed in the Australian region on February 20 – Bianca and Alfred – while in the South-West Indian Ocean, two cyclones also formed near Madagascar: Garance and Honde. The former eventually became an intense tropical cyclone on February 27 before making landfall in the northern part of Réunion the next day as a slightly weaker tropical cyclone.

Tropical cyclones formed in February 2025
Storm name	Dates active	Max wind km/h (mph)	Pressure (hPa)	Areas affected	Damage (USD)	Deaths	Refs
16U/06F	February 1–8	75 (45)	996	None	None	None	
19U/07F	February 7–13	75 (45)	998	Queensland, New Caledonia	None	None	
Zelia	February 7–14	215 (130)	927	Kimberley, Pilbara	$733 million	None	
20U	February 11–13	Unknown	1002	None	None	None	
TD	February 11–17	55 (35)	1006	Vietnam, Malaysia, Philippines (Palawan)	None	None	
Bianca	February 18–26	175 (110)	954	None	None	None	
08F	February 19–22	65 (40)	998	None	None	None	
Alfred	February 21 – March 9	165 (105)	951	Willis Island, South East Queensland, northeastern New South Wales	>$1.36 billion	1	
Rae	February 22–26	110 (70)	975	Fiji, Wallis and Futuna, Tonga	None	None	
Garance	February 24 – March 2	175 (110)	951	Northern Madagascar, Réunion, Mauritius	$1.05 billion	5	
Honde	February 24 – March 5	120 (75)	968	Mozambique, Madagascar	$10 million	3	
Seru	February 24–27	110 (70)	980	Fiji, Vanuatu	None	None	

=== March ===
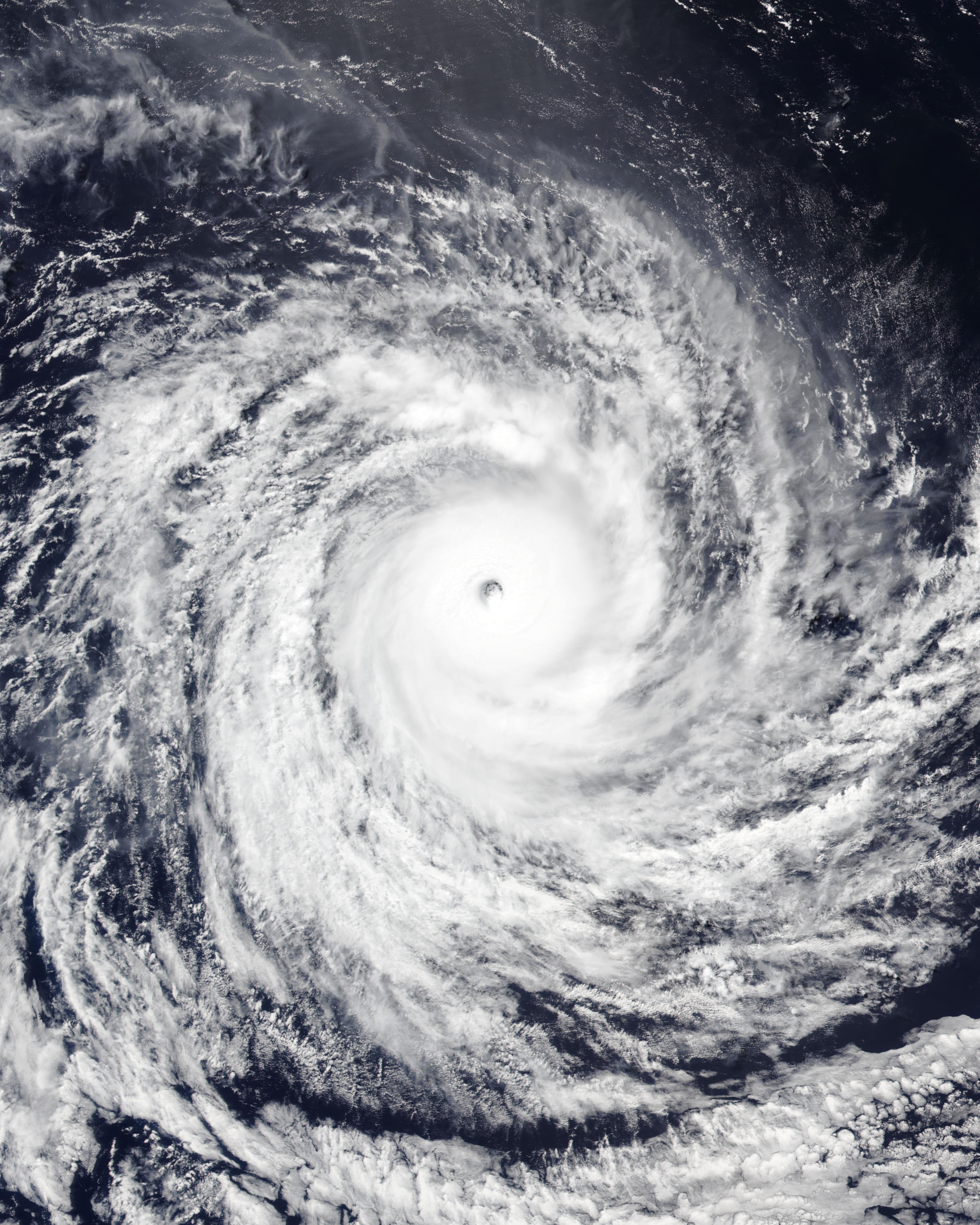
Cyclone Courtney

March was slightly inactive, featuring five storms, four of which were named. Cyclone Alfred, Honde, and Garance formed in February and persisted into March. The strongest storm of the month is Cyclone Courtney. At the start of the month, Cyclone Jude caused 21 deaths, 4 missing people, and around 130 people injured in Southeastern Africa, primarily Mozambique and Madagascar. Alfred stalled for a day on March 5 about 333 kilometers (107 miles) away from Brisbane, Australia, as a tropical storm (a Category 2 on the Australian scale). An unnamed but tagged tropical cyclone, Cyclone 26S (or 25U) roamed near the Cocos (Kneeling) Islands with its convection mainly on its Western side. On March 28, Cyclone Dianne formed south of the Ashmore & Cartier Islands. Dianne made landfall near Derby, Australia about 37 miles (60 kilometers) on March 29, causing minimal impacts. Cyclone Courtney began weakening towards the end of March and dissipated on April 2.

Tropical cyclones formed in March 2025
Storm name	Dates active	Max wind km/h (mph)	Pressure (hPa)	Areas affected	Damage (USD)	Deaths	Refs
Jude	March 6–16	140 (85)	970	Madagascar, Mayotte, Comoros, Mozambique	>$110 million	21	
Ivone	March 6–11	95 (60)	981	None	None	None	
25U	March 17–22	85 (50)	991	Indonesia, Christmas Islands, Cocos Islands	None	None	
Courtney	March 22–31	205 (125)	934	Indonesia	None	None	
Dianne	March 25–29	95 (60)	984	Western Australia, Northern Territory	None	None	

=== April ===
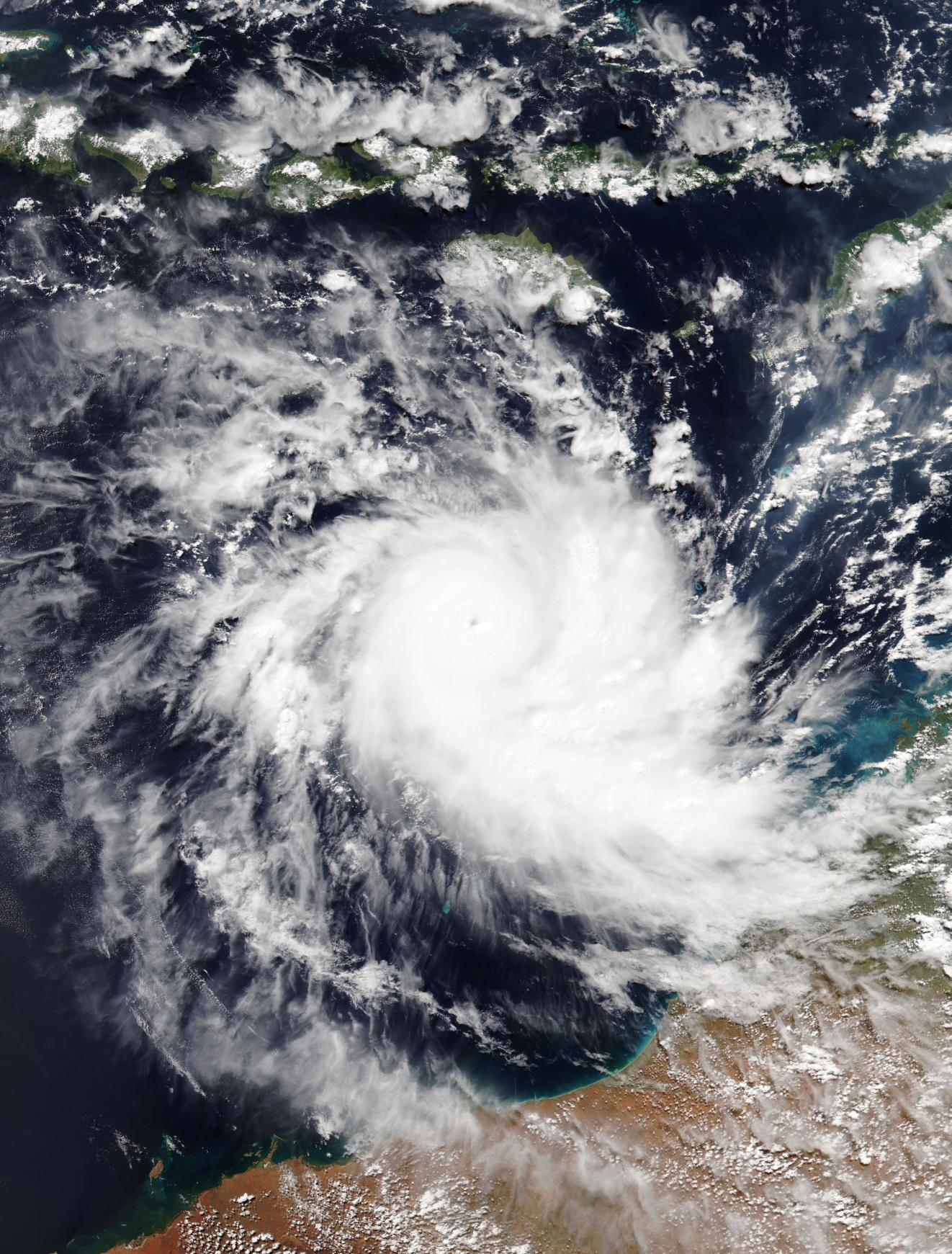
Cyclone Errol

April was a very inactive month, being the least active month of the year, with four storms forming, three of which were named. The month started off in the Australian basin with the formation of Cyclone Errol, which would later become the second Category 5 equivalent cyclone of the year, and was the strongest cyclone of the month. Following that was the formation of Tropical Low 30U. In the South Pacific basin, Cyclone Tam formed and briefly impacted Vanuatu. On April 20, Kanto formed, become the first subtropical cyclone in the South-west Indian Ocean since subtropical storm Issa in April 2022.

Tropical cyclones formed in April 2025
Storm name	Dates active	Max wind km/h (mph)	Pressure (hPa)	Areas affected	Damage (USD)	Deaths	Refs
Errol	April 9–18	205 (125)	936	Maluku, Kimberley	None	None	
30U	April 13–23	65 (40)	998	Maluku, Queensland, Top End	None	None	
Tam	April 14–16	85 (50)	986	Vanuatu, New Zealand	None	None	
Kanto	April 20–21	75 (45)	993	None	None	None	

=== May ===
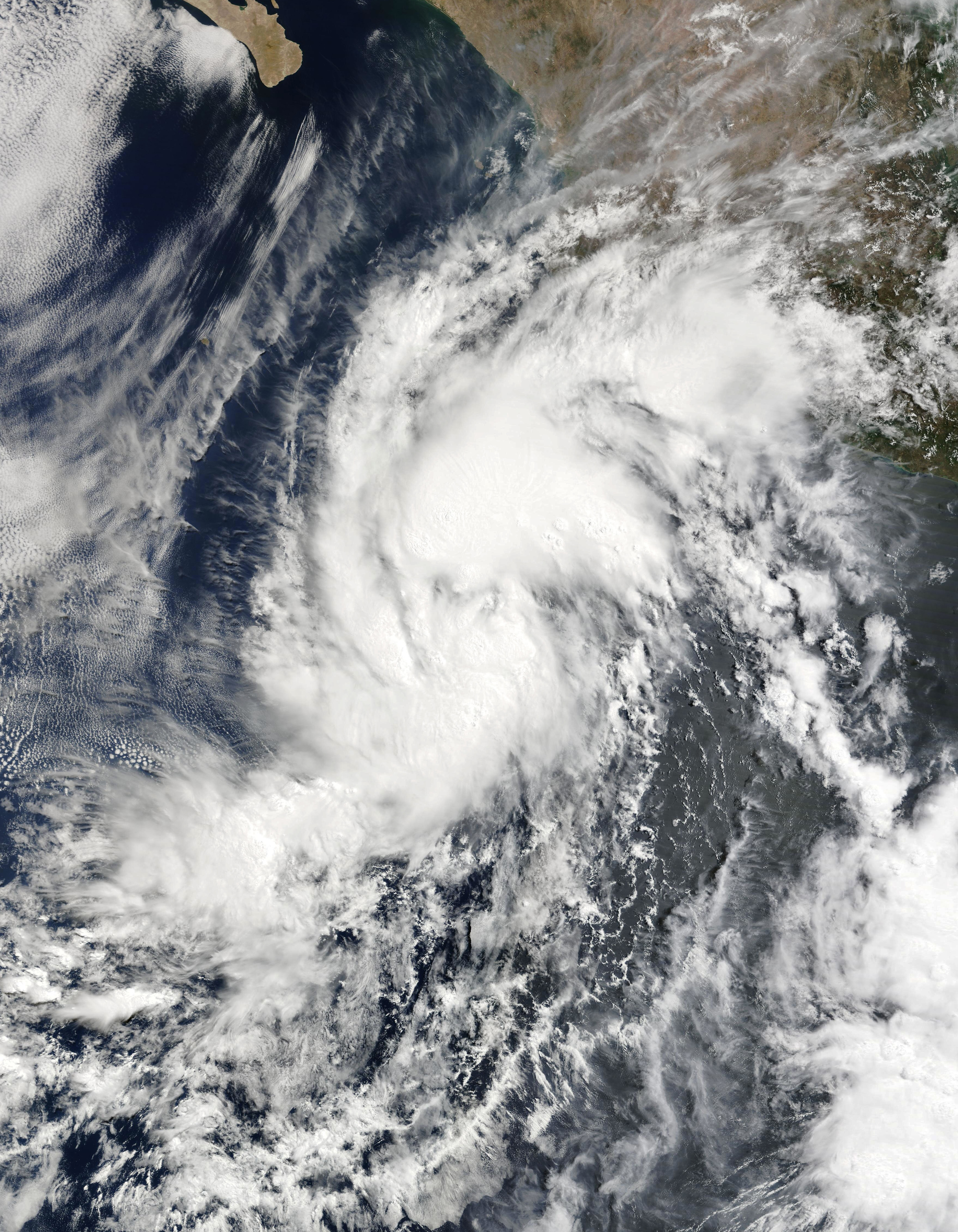
Tropical Storm Alvin

May was a below average month featuring five cyclones, with only one named. Around the approaching middle portions of the month, Tropical Low 33U & 34U were offseason lows in the Australian region, the former formed near Papua New Guinea and was marked 32P by the JTWC, while the latter formed near the Solomon Islands. By the latter parts of the month, ARB 01 formed off the western Indian coast and moved inland. Tropical Storm Alvin formed in the Eastern Pacific and dissipated while approaching the Baja California peninsula, it was also the strongest storm of the month. BOB 01 was the second North Indian cyclone to form in May, showing the signs of increasing activity alongside ARB 01 in the North Indian Ocean during this month, BOB 01 primarily impacted Bangladesh and East India.

Tropical cyclones formed in May 2025
Storm name	Dates active	Max wind km/h (mph)	Pressure (hPa)	Areas affected	Damage (USD)	Deaths	Refs
33U	May 9–12	65 (40)	1000	Papua New Guinea, Indonesia (South Papua)	None	None	
34U	May 11–14	45 (30)	1003	Solomon Islands, Rennell Island	None	None	
ARB 01	May 24–25	45 (30)	997	Western India, South India, Lakshadweep	Unknown	None	
Alvin	May 28–31	95 (60)	999	Central America, Baja California Peninsula, Western Mexico	>$986,000	5	
BOB 01	May 29–30	55 (35)	988	East India, Bangladesh, Northeast India, Myanmar, Bhutan	Unknown	65	

=== June ===
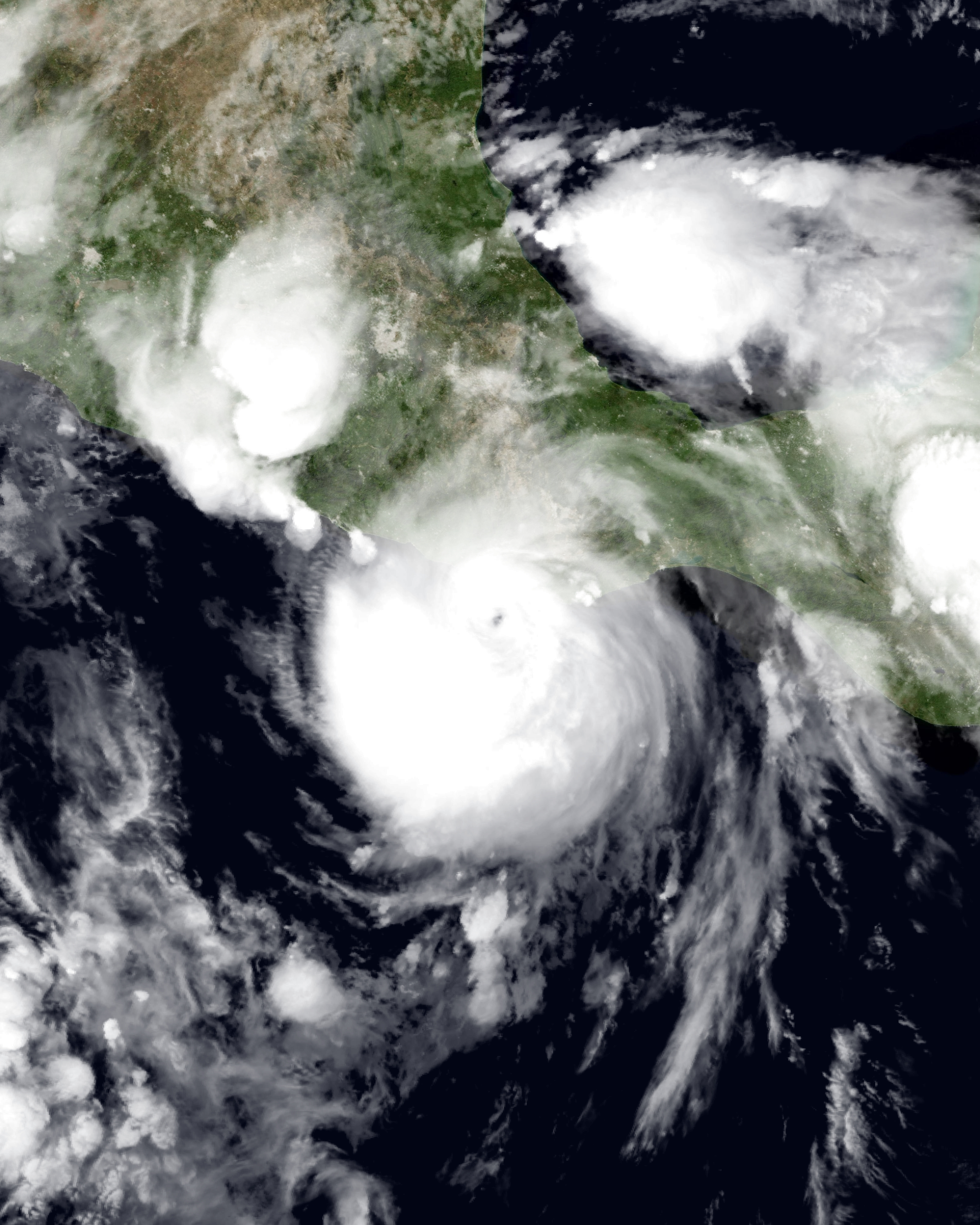
Hurricane Erick

June was very active with eleven tropical cyclones forming, ten of which have been named, nine of them officially received such. Hurricane Barbara, Tropical Storm Cosme, Tropical Storm Dalila, and Hurricane Erick formed in the eastern Pacific, the latter becoming the first major hurricane in the Northern Hemisphere in the year. In the Western Pacific, Tropical Storm Wutip formed in the South China Sea and crossed Hainan before reaching South China. Tropical Depression Auring formed a few days later that month, passing near the Philippines before crossing Taiwan and reaching East China. Tropical Storm Sepat formed in the Pacific Ocean southeast of Japan. On June 24, a short-lived Tropical Storm Andrea formed in the Subtropical Atlantic, also on that day a tropical disturbance formed near the Philippines in the South China Sea, and the next day became a tropical depression tagged 03W, making landfall in Hainan and the Leizhou Peninsula on the eastern side, nearly 2 weeks after Wutip made landfall on the western side. On June 27, a new tropical disturbance in the Gulf of Honduras has been designated by the NHC, causing scattered heavy rain across eastern Mexico and Guatemala. Mainly light rainfall fell over Central America, particularly Honduras and Costa Rica. It later became Tropical Storm Barry on June 29 in the Gulf of Mexico. Hurricane Flossie also formed on the same day near the Pacific coast of Mexico, persisting into the next month, July.

Tropical cyclones formed in June 2025
Storm name	Dates active	Max wind km/h (mph)	Pressure (hPa)	Areas affected	Damage (USD)	Deaths	Refs
Barbara	June 8–11	120 (75)	991	Southwestern Mexico	None	None	
Cosme	June 8–11	110 (70)	991	None	None	None	
Wutip	June 9–15	100 (65)	980	Philippines, Vietnam, Cambodia, Laos, Thailand, South China, East China, Hong Kong, Macau	>$308 million	21	
Auring	June 11–13	55 (35)	1004	Philippines, Taiwan, Central China, East China	Unknown	1	
Dalila	June 13–15	100 (65)	992	Southwestern Mexico	$39.4 million	1	
Erick	June 17–20	220 (140)	944	Honduras, Guatemala, Southern Mexico	>$275 million	24	
Sepat	June 22–26	65 (40)	1001	Japan (Bonin Islands, Izu Islands)	None	None	
03W	June 24–27	55 (35)	1002	Philippines, South China, Vietnam, Hong Kong, Macau	Unknown	6	
Andrea	June 24–24	65 (40)	1014	None	None	None	
Barry	June 28–30	75 (45)	1006	Belize, Yucatán Peninsula, Eastern Mexico, USA (Texas)	>$32.3 million	8	
Flossie	June 29 – July 3	195 (120)	958	Southwestern Mexico, Revillagigedo Islands	Unknown	1	

=== July ===
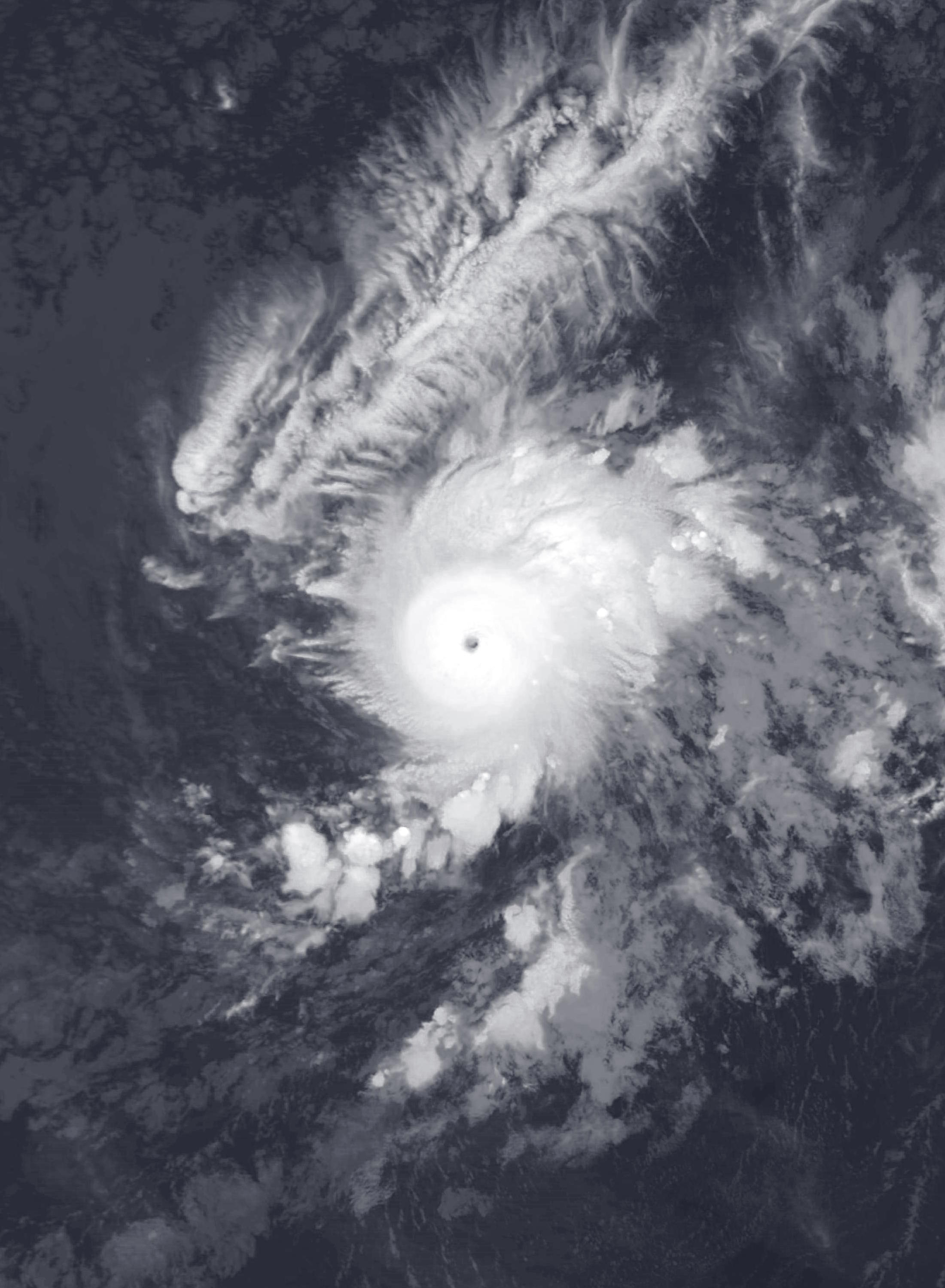
Hurricane Iona

July was abnormally active compared to the previous year, featuring eighteen systems, with twelve of them being named; this month includes Mun, Danas, Chantal, Nari, Wipha, Francisco, Co-May, Krosa, Iona, Keli, Gil, and Bailu with Iona being the strongest in the month of July. Flossie became the second major hurricane in the Northern Hemisphere, which had formed in June and persisted into the current month. Mun had formed in the open Pacific Ocean with an erratic path, while Danas dropped heavy rain across Taiwan. Chantal moved up north, affecting the Carolinas. Nari made landfall on Hokkaido whilst weakening, and Wipha moved toward China, and its remnants concentrated into a depression over North Indian Ocean and became BOB 04. Also, notably, Tropical Depression 01 formed in the South-West Indian Ocean on July 16, becoming the first tropical cyclone to form there in July since 2016. Wipha, Francisco, and Co-May enhanced the southwest monsoon, producing floods in Philippines slightly similar to Gaemi in 2024. Co-May formed north of the Philippines and became the strongest typhoon to strike Pangasinan since 2009, due to interaction with Francisco which caused it to loop northeast towards the Ilocos Region. In the Central Pacific, Hurricane Iona and Tropical Storm Keli formed in rapid succession. Iona strengthened to a major hurricane. Hurricane Gil formed in the Eastern Pacific while Tropical Storm Bailu formed in the Western Pacific on July 31, and both of them persisted into August.

Tropical cyclones formed in July 2025
Storm name	Dates active	Max wind km/h (mph)	Pressure (hPa)	Areas affected	Damage (USD)	Deaths	Refs
Mun	July 1–8	95 (60)	990	None	None	None	
Danas (Bising)	July 3–11	140 (85)	965	Philippines, Taiwan, South China, East China, Hong Kong, Japan (Ryukyu Islands), Macau	$243 million	10	
Chantal	July 4–7	95 (60)	1002	Southeastern United States, Mid-Atlantic, Northeastern United States, Atlantic Canada	$56 million (Per local officials)	6	
Nari	July 11–15	95 (60)	985	Japan (Kuril Islands, Bonin Islands, Izu Islands, East, North), Alaska	$1 million	None	
07W	July 11–14	55 (35)	992	Taiwan, China (Zhejiang), West Japan, Korea	Minimal	None	
BOB 02/LAND 03	July 14–20	45 (30)	993	East India, Myanmar, Northeast India, Bangladesh, Central India, Northwest India	Unknown	None	
01	July 15–18	55 (35)	1001	None	None	None	
08W	July 15–16	85 (50)	1001	Japan (Izu Islands, Kuril Islands, North, Northeast, East)	Unknown	None	
LAND 01	July 15–16	35 (25)	998	Northwest India, Pakistan	Unknown	None	
Wipha (Crising)	July 16–23	110 (70)	975	Philippines, Taiwan, South China, Hong Kong, Macau, Vietnam, Laos, Cambodia, Myanmar	$461 million	20	
Francisco (Dante)	July 22–27	75 (45)	990	Philippines, Japan (Ryukyu Islands), Taiwan, East China	Unknown	None	
Co-May (Emong)	July 23 – August 3	110 (70)	975	Philippines, Taiwan, Japan (Ryukyu Islands), East China, Central China, Korea	$42.9 million	29	
Krosa	July 23 – August 4	140 (85)	965	Guam, Northern Mariana Islands, Japan (Bonin Islands, Izu Islands Kantō region)	Minimal	None	
BOB 04	July 25–27	45 (30)	988	Myanmar, Bangladesh, Central India, East India	None	None	
Iona	July 27 – August 4	215 (130)	956	None	None	None	
Keli	July 28–30	85 (50)	1003	None	None	None	
Bailu	July 31 – August 5	65 (40)	994	Japan (Ryukyu Islands. Izu Islands)	None	None	
Gil	July 31 – August 3	120 (75)	991	None	None	None	

=== August ===
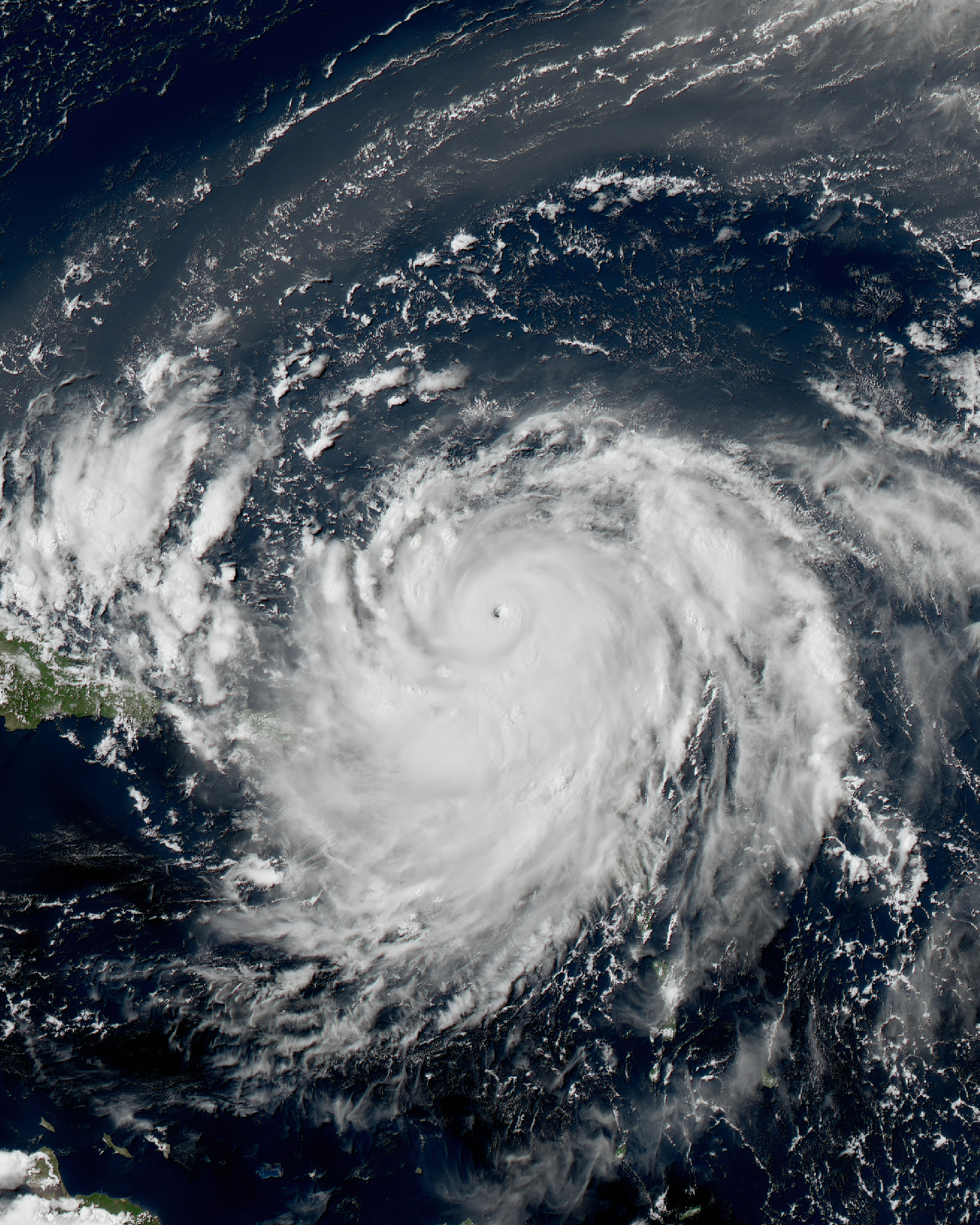
Hurricane Erin

August was an average month, Co-May, Krosa, Iona, Gil, and Bailu formed in July and persisted into August. 19 systems formed, with twelve of them named, including: Dexter, Henriette, Podul, Ivo, Awo, Fabian, Erin, Lingling, Kajiki, Fernand, Juliette, Nongfa, and Kiko with Erin being the strongest in this month, and also the first hurricane in the Atlantic basin. Kiko persisted into the next month, September.

Tropical cyclones formed in August 2025
Storm name	Dates active	Max wind km/h (mph)	Pressure (hPa)	Areas affected	Damage (USD)	Deaths	Refs
TD	August 1–2	Unknown	996	Unknown	Unknown	None	
14W	August 2–4	Unknown	1010	None	None	None	
Dexter	August 3–6	95 (60)	999	None	None	None	
Henriette	August 4–13	140 (85)	986	None	None	None	
15W	August 4–6	Unknown	1006	None	None	None	
Podul (Gorio)	August 6–15	150 (90)	960	Northern Mariana Islands, Philippines, Ryukyu Islands, Taiwan, East China, South China, Hong Kong, Macau	$332 million	2	
Ivo	August 6–11	100 (65)	998	Southwestern Mexico, Revillagigedo Islands, Baja California Sur	>$58,000	None	
Awo	August 7–8	65 (40)	1000	Agaléga	None	None	
Fabian	August 7–9	Unknown	1006	Philippines	None	None	
Erin	August 11–22	260 (160)	913	Cape Verde, Lesser Antilles, Puerto Rico, Hispaniola, Lucayan Archipelago	$25 million	13	
17W	August 17–19	55 (35)	1000	South China, Vietnam, Hong Kong, Macau	None	None	
Lingling (Huaning)	August 17–23	85 (50)	994	Ryukyu Islands, Kyūshū	None	None	
BOB 05	August 18–19	35 (25)	993	East India	None	None	
Kajiki (Isang)	August 22–26	150 (90)	950	Philippines, South China, Hong Kong, Macau, Vietnam, Laos, Cambodia, Thailand	$244 million	17	
Fernand	August 23–28	95 (60)	999	None	None	None	
Juliette	August 24–28	110 (70)	994	None	None	None	
Nongfa (Jacinto)	August 27–31	75 (45)	996	Philippines, Vietnam, Laos, Thailand, Myanmar	$12,076	None	
Kiko	August 31 – September 10	230 (145)	945	Hawaii	None	None	

=== September ===
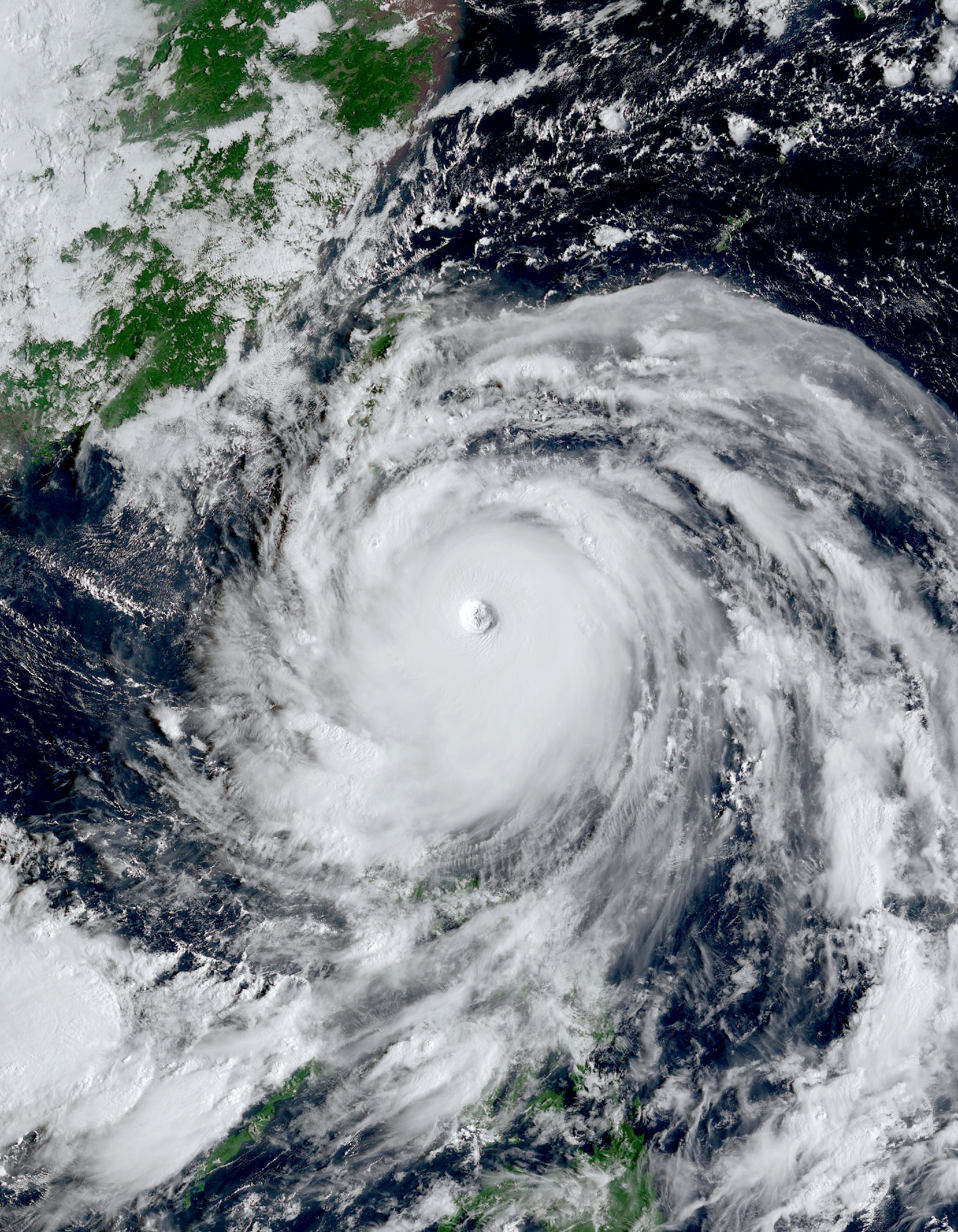
Typhoon Ragasa

September was slightly below average, but deadly and costly, with sixteen tropical cyclones forming, and fourteen of them being named. Out of all the tropical cyclones this month, Typhoon Ragasa in the western Pacific was the strongest. It caused heavy rains and devastation in parts of Hong Kong, Macau, South China, and Vietnam, resulting 29 deaths and $1.62 billion in damage. Hurricane Kiko, a tropical storm that formed on the final day of August and persisted into September, rapidly intensified into a Category 4 major hurricane. Typhoon Bualoi first made landfall in the Philippines and then in Vietnam, causing 46 deaths and $34 million in damage. Typhoon Neoguri formed without affecting any areas, and before weakening, it strengthened into a Category 4 typhoon of unusually high latitude near 40°N, making it one of the strongest unusual high latitude cyclones on record. Hurricane Humberto in the Atlantic Ocean became the second Category 5 hurricane of the season, following Erin last month. Hurricane Imelda formed in the Bahamas, causing heavy rains in some affected areas and later peaking as a Category 2 hurricane, while Humberto weakened rapidly. Both persisted into October. The month ends with the formation of Tropical Storm Octave in the eastern Pacific Ocean, which also persisted into the next month, October.

Tropical cyclones formed in September 2025
Storm name	Dates active	Max wind km/h (mph)	Pressure (hPa)	Areas affected	Damage (USD)	Deaths	Refs
Lorena	September 2–5	140 (85)	981	Baja California Sur, Northwestern Mexico	>$1.81 million	4	
Peipah (Kiko)	September 2–5	85 (50)	992	Japan	$150 million	1	
Tapah (Lannie)	September 4–9	110 (70)	980	Philippines, South China, Hong Kong	None	None	
Blossom	September 9–11	65 (40)	1003	None	None	None	
LAND 04	September 9–11	55 (35)	995	Western India, Northern India, Central India, Pakistan	Unknown	None	
Mario	September 11–16	100 (65)	994	Southern Mexico, Revillagigedo Islands	>$11.4 million	3	
Mitag (Mirasol)	September 16–20	95 (60)	992	Philippines, Taiwan, South China, Hong Kong, Macau	$84.8 million	3	
Ragasa (Nando)	September 17–25	205 (125)	905	Philippines, Taiwan, Hong Kong, Macau, South China	>$1.74 billion	29	
Gabrielle	September 17–25	220 (140)	944	Bermuda, Azores, Iberian Peninsula	$30 million	None	
Neoguri	September 17–28	195 (120)	920	Wake Island, Ogasawara, Minamitorishima	None	None	
Narda	September 21–29	165 (105)	970	None	None	None	
Bualoi (Opong)	September 22–29	140 (85)	965	Caroline Islands, Philippines, South China, Vietnam, Laos, Cambodia, Thailand	$951 million	94	
Humberto	September 24 – October 1	260 (160)	918	None	None	None	
BOB 06	September 26–28	45 (30)	996	East India, Southeast India	Unknown	None	
Imelda	September 27 – October 2	150 (90)	966	Guadeloupe, Virgin Islands, Puerto Rico, Dominican Republic, Haiti, Turks and Caicos Islands, Bahamas, Cuba, Bermuda	>$10 million	5	
Octave	September 30 – October 9	150 (90)	980	None	None	None	

=== October ===
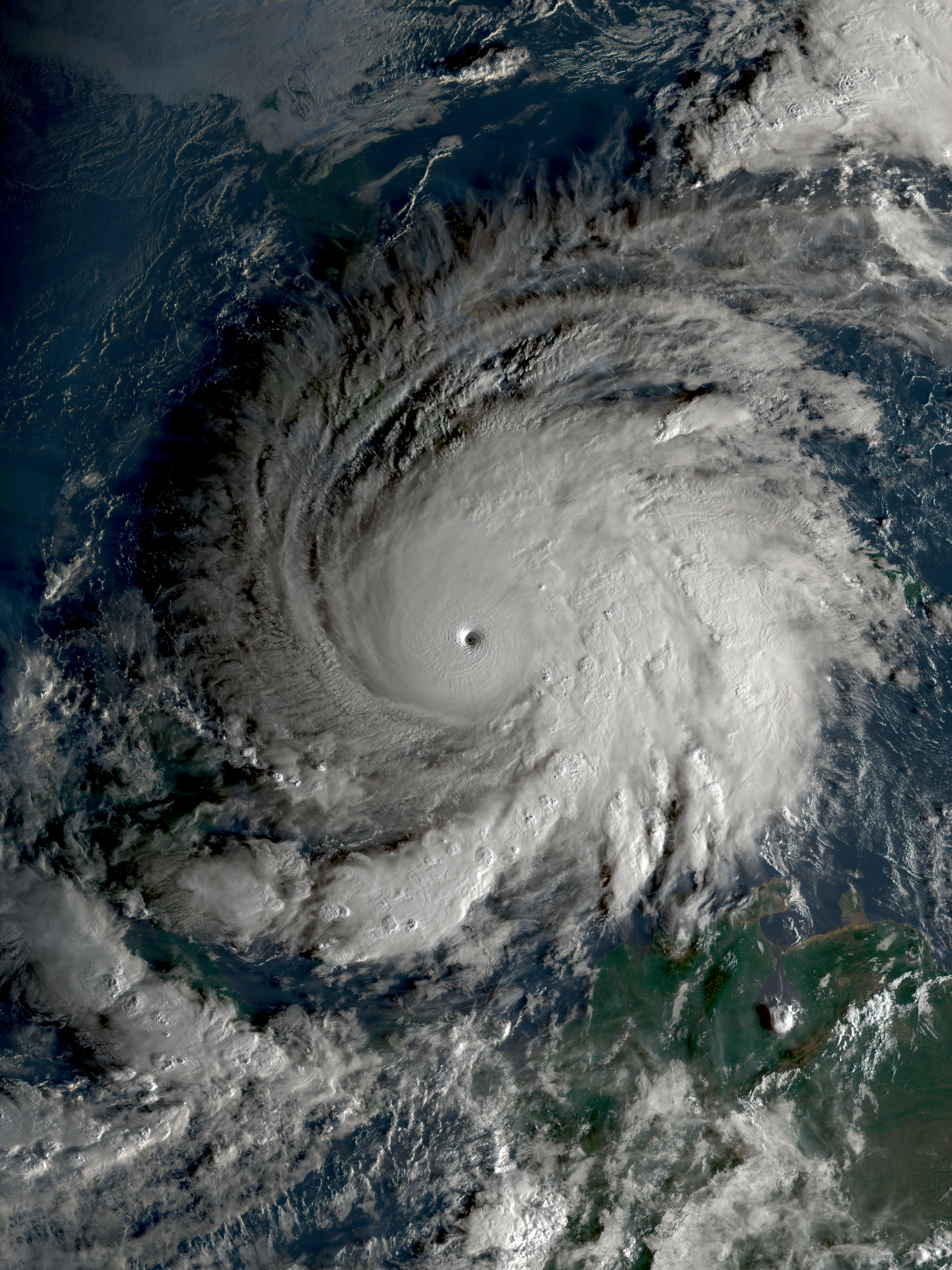
Hurricane Melissa

October was very active, being the most active since 2013. Furthermore, it was deadly and costly, with nineteen tropical cyclones forming, and sixteen of them being named. Out of all the tropical cyclones this month, Hurricane Melissa in the North Atlantic was the strongest and most intense in the year globally. The month started with Typhoon Matmo, which severely affected the Philippines, South China, Hong Kong, Macau, Vietnam, Laos, and Thailand, killing 39 people. Meanwhile, a deep depression in the North Indian Ocean, designated as BOB 07, killed 111 people in India, Nepal and Bhutan. In the same basin, Shakhti became the first named cyclone for the 2025 season. Other notable tropical cyclones include Typhoon Halong, which caused heavy rainfall in Japan and later impacted Alaska as a powerful extratropical cyclone, and Tropical Storm Fengshen which caused extensive flooding and landslides in the Philippines, despite causing less damage than preceding storms. However, the most notable cyclone of the month by far is the aforementioned Hurricane Melissa, which explosively intensified into a major hurricane and made landfall in Jamaica at Category 5 intensity, becoming the strongest hurricane to make landfall in the island's history, surpassing 1988's Hurricane Gilbert. Also tied with the 1935 Labor Day hurricane for the most intense landfall in the Atlantic basin, Melissa killed 95 people, mostly in the Caribbean nations of Haiti and Jamaica. The last tropical cyclone of the month, Typhoon Kalmaegi persisted through November and would kill 269 people after devastating central Philippines, particularly Cebu and Negros.

Tropical cyclones formed in October 2025
Storm name	Dates active	Max wind km/h (mph)	Pressure (hPa)	Areas affected	Damage (USD)	Deaths	Refs
Matmo (Paolo)	October 1–7	130 (80)	970	Philippines, South China, Hong Kong, Macau, Vietnam, Laos, Thailand	>$3.86 billion	39	
BOB 07	October 1–3	55 (35)	995	East India, Southeast India, South India, Central India, Uttar Pradesh, Nepal, Bangladesh, Northeast India, Tibet, Bhutan	$83 million	111	
Shakhti	October 1–7	110 (70)	990	Western India, Oman	None	None	
Halong	October 4–10	185 (115)	935	Bonin Islands, Izu Islands, Volcano Islands, Kantō region, Alaska	$125 million	2	
Priscilla	October 4–10	185 (115)	954	Southwestern Mexico	>58,000	Unknown	See also: October 2025 Mexico floods and landslides
Nakri (Quedan)	October 6–14	130 (80)	970	Guam, Northern Mariana Islands, Ryukyu Islands, Southern Japan, Izu Islands, Kantō region	Minimal	None	
Jerry	October 7–11	100 (65)	1000	Leeward Islands	Minimal	1	
Raymond	October 9–11	95 (60)	998	Southwestern Mexico	Unknown	4	See also: October 2025 Mexico floods and landslides
Karen	October 9-10	75 (45)	998	None	None	None	
Fengshen (Ramil)	October 12–23	100 (65)	990	Guam, Northern Mariana Islands, Philippines	Unknown	7	
Lorenzo	October 13–15	95 (60)	1000	None	None	None	
Chenge	October 17–25	95 (60)	987	Chagos Archipelago	None	None	
TL	October 19–22	55 (35)	1009	None	None	None	
Salome	October 20–23	Unknown	1004	Taiwan, Ryukyu Islands, Philippines	Minimal	None	
Melissa	October 21–31	305 (190)	892	Windward Islands, Greater Antilles (particularly Haiti, Jamaica and Cuba), Colombia, Lucayan Archipelago, Coastal Northeastern United States, Newfoundland	$10 billion	102	
ARB 03	October 22 – November 1	45 (30)	1000	Western India	None	None	
Sonia	October 24–29	85 (50)	1001	None	None	None	
Montha	October 25–29	95 (60)	988	Andaman and Nicobar Islands, Sri Lanka, South India, Odisha, Central India, Maharashtra, East India	$760 million	15	
Kalmaegi (Tino)	October 31 – November 7	165 (105)	950	Caroline Islands, Philippines (particularly Cebu and Negros), Vietnam, Thailand	$546 million+	288+	

=== November ===
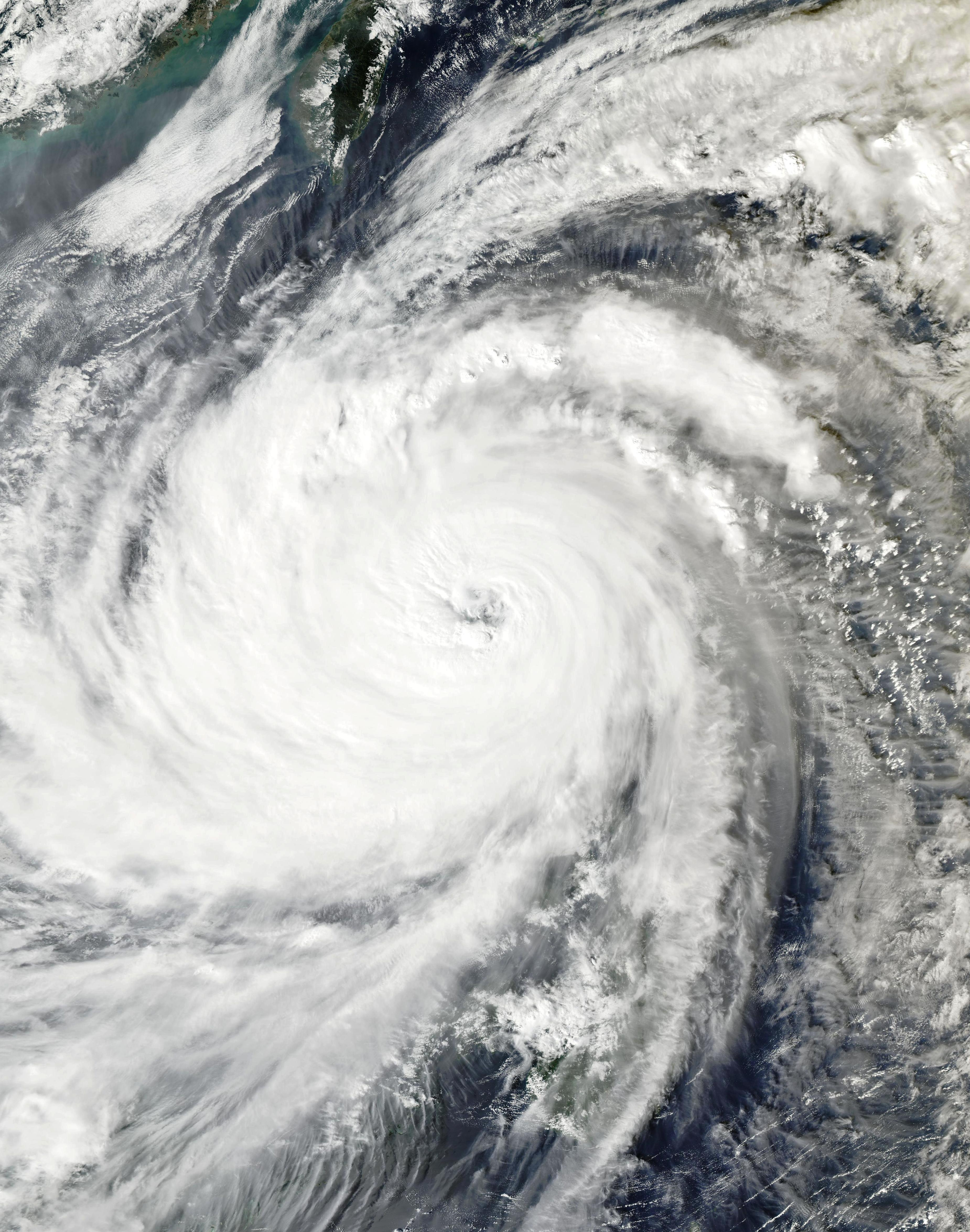
Typhoon Fung-wong

November was a below average, but very deadly and costly month with six systems and five of them being named; Typhoon Fung-wong, Cyclone Fina, Typhoon Koto, Cyclone Senyar, and Cyclone Ditwah with Fung-wong being the strongest out of the five. One cyclone that formed the previous month (October) and persisted into November is Typhoon Kalmaegi. Fung-wong made landfall in the Philippines just five days after Typhoon Kalmaegi battered central parts of the country. Cyclone Fina formed in mid November 2025 and intensified into a Category 4 tropical cyclone, causing significant power outages in the large parts of Darwin, Palmerston, and the Tiwi Islands. Typhoon Koto compounded the impacts from the recent Typhoon Kalmaegi and Fung-wong in the Philippines. Cyclone Senyar became the first tropical cyclone to form in the Strait of Malacca since reliable records began. Notably, Cyclone Senyar crossed the Western Pacific and regenerated as it emerged into the South China Sea. Cyclone Senyar caused catastrophic flooding and landslides to the Malay Peninsula and Sumatra in late November 2025, resulting in 1,454+ deaths in Thailand, Indonesia and Malaysia and a financial loss of at least US$19.8 billion, making this system the deadliest and the costliest of the year. It also caused some of the events in the upcoming 2025 SEA Games to be moved from Songkhla to Bangkok and Chonburi. Cyclone Ditwah formed in late November 2025, made landfall in Sri Lanka, and caused 647+ deaths in Sri Lanka and India due to flooding and landslides.

Tropical cyclones formed in November 2025
Storm name	Dates active	Max wind km/h (mph)	Pressure (hPa)	Areas affected	Damage (USD)	Deaths	Refs
Fung-wong (Uwan)	November 4–13	175 (110)	935	Caroline Islands, Guam, Northern Mariana Islands, Philippines, Taiwan, East China, Ryukyu Islands	$104 million	34	
Fina	November 14–25	185 (115)	943	Timor-Leste, Indonesia, Australia	Unknown	None	
TL	November 14–16	45 (30)	1007	Indonesia	Unknown	None	
Koto (Verbena)	November 23 – December 3	140 (85)	965	Philippines, Vietnam. Cambodia	$9.6 million	2	
Senyar (34W)	November 25–30	75 (45)	999	Southern Thailand, Peninsular Malaysia, Sumatra, Andaman and Nicobar Islands	$19.8 billion	2,253+	
Ditwah	November 26 – December 3	75 (45)	1000	Sri Lanka, South India	$1.64 billion	647+	

=== December ===
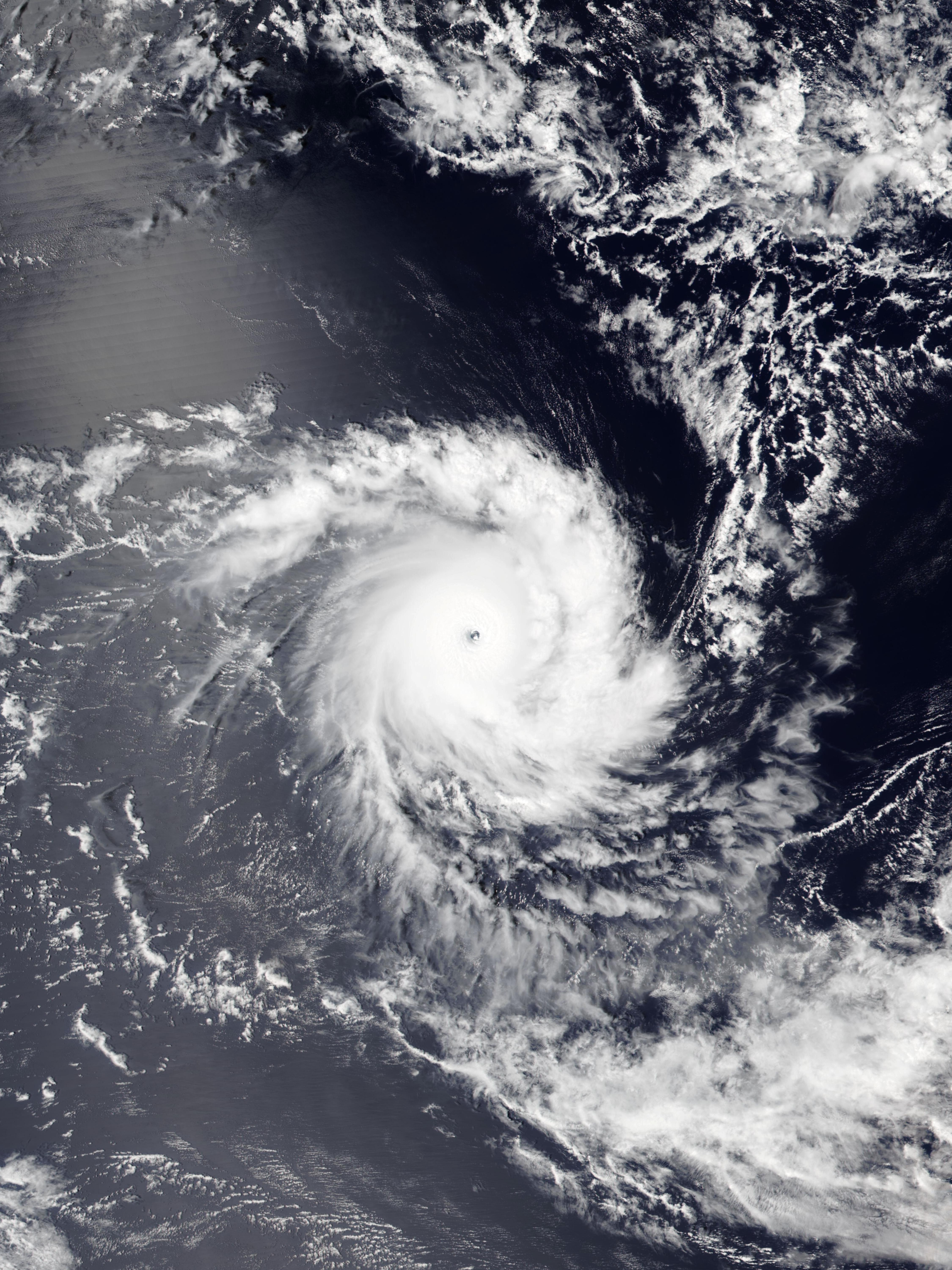
Cyclone Grant

December was somewhat active, but very inactive in terms of named storms with nine systems forming, and three of them being named; Cyclone Bakung, Cyclone Grant and Cyclone Hayley in the Australian Region, with another storm – Wilma – receiving a name that is deemed unofficial outside of the Philippines, and one more – Iggy – getting named in 2026. Additionally, two systems – Cyclone Ditwah and Typhoon Koto – both formed in November and persisted into December.

Tropical cyclones formed in December 2025
Storm name	Dates active	Max wind km/h (mph)	Pressure (hPa)	Areas affected	Damage (USD)	Deaths	Refs
Wilma	December 1–9	55 (35)	1004	Philippines	Unknown	None	
01F	December 3–5	85 (50)	999	French Polynesia	None	None	
02F	December 5–7	75 (45)	1000	French Polynesia	None	None	
Bakung	December 7–18	165 (105)	957	Indonesia	None	None	
"Revegoca"	December 9–12	100 (60)	978	Brazil, Paraguay, Argentina, Antarctica	$259.5 million	1	
03F	December 11–17	75 (45)	1000	Solomon Islands	None	None	
07U	December 15–20	Unknown	1005	Indonesia	None	None	
Grant	December 15–January 6 2026	205 (125)	944	Indonesia, Christmas Island, St. Brandon	Unknown	None	
Hayley	December 27–31	165 (105)	952	Indonesia, Australia	Unknown	None	
04F	December 29–January 2 2026	45 (30)	1001	American Samoa, Samoa	Unknown	None	
Iggy	December 29–January 2 2026	75 (45)	997	Indonesia, Christmas Island	Unknown	None	

== Global effects ==
There are a total of seven tropical cyclone basins that tropical cyclones typically form in this table, data from all these basins are added.

Season name		Areas affected	Systems formed	Named storms	Hurricane-force tropical cyclones	Damage (2025 USD)	Deaths	Ref.
North Atlantic Ocean (Note: The wind speeds for this tropical cyclone/basin are based on the Saffir Simpson Scale which uses 1-minute sustained winds.)		Northern Central America, Yucatán Peninsula, Eastern Mexico, Southeastern United States, Cabo Verde, Leeward Islands, Puerto Rico, Hispaniola, Lucayan Archipelago, Atlantic Canada, Bermuda, Azores, Iberian Peninsula	13	13	5	>$12.78 billion	125 (3)	
Eastern and Central Pacific Ocean		Central America, Baja California Peninsula, Southern Mexico, Hawaii	20	20	11	>$434.5 million	44 (1)	
Western Pacific Ocean (Note: Only systems that formed either before or on December 31, 2025 are counted in the seasonal totals.)		Vietnam, Malaysia, Philippines, Cambodia, Laos, China, Macau, Hong Kong, Japan, Taiwan, Myanmar, Thailand, Caroline Islands, Bonin Islands	40 (Note: Tropical Storm 08W was recognized by the Joint Typhoon Warning Center (JTWC), which is included in this table even though it was not named by the Japan Meteorological Agency.)	28	17	>$10.48 billion	653	
North Indian Ocean (Note: The wind speeds for this tropical cyclone/basin are based on the IMD Scale which uses 3-minute sustained winds.)		Western India, South India, Lakshadweep, Northeast India, East India, Central India, Bangladesh, Myanmar, Bhutan, Northwest India, Pakistan, North India, Nepal, Tibet, Oman	14	4	1	>$22.31 billion	3,110	
South-West Indian Ocean	January – June (Note: Only systems that formed either on or after January 1, 2025 are counted in the seasonal totals.) (Note: The wind speeds for this tropical cyclone are based on Météo-France, which uses wind gusts.)	Madagascar, Mayotte, Mozambique, Comoros, Europa Island, Mascarene Islands, Île Amsterdam, Mauritius, Réunion, Agaléga, Seychelles, Zimbabwe, Malawi, Kerguelen Islands	7 (Note: Although two systems formed in this basin, there are three named storms because after Tropical Low 08U moved into this basin, it was given a name, Dikeledi, by the MFR.)	5 (Note: According to the BoM, Cyclones Vince, Taliah, and Courtney entered the South-West Indian Ocean basin from the Australian region)	3	>$1.19 billion	38	
South-West Indian Ocean	July – December	Chagos Archipelago, Agaléga, Seychelles, Tanzania, Kenya	3	3	—N/a	Unknown	—N/a	
Australian region	January – June	Broome, Port Hedland, Western Australia, Christmas Island, Cocos Islands, Queensland, Kimberley, Pilbara, Willis Island, New South Wales, Indonesia, Northern Territory	23	13	9	>$2.09 billion	2	
Australian region	July – December	Southeast Asia, Western Australia	7	5	4	Unknown	—N/a	
South Pacific Ocean	January – June	Tonga, Niue, Cook Islands, Samoa, Loyalty Islands, New Caledonia, French Polynesia, Vanuatu, Fiji, Wallis and Futuna, Norfolk Islands, New Zealand	8	4	1	Unknown	0 (6)	
South Pacific Ocean	July – December	French Polynesia, American Samoa Samoa	4	—N/a	Unknown	Unknown		
South Atlantic Ocean		Brazil, Paraguay, Argentina	1	1	—N/a	$259.50 million	1	
Worldwide		(See above)	139 (Note: The sum of the number of systems in each basin will not equal the number shown as the total. This is because when systems move between basins, it creates a discrepancy in the actual number of systems.)	96	51	$49.3 billion	3,972 (10)	

== See also ==
- Tropical cyclones by year
- List of earthquakes in 2025
- Tornadoes in 2025
- Weather of 2025
- NOAA under the second presidency of Donald Trump
