= De Grey, Western Australia =

Locality in the Pilbara, Western Australia

- Interactive map of De Grey, Western Australia
- Coordinates: 20°13′02″S 119°11′48″E
- Country: Australia

De Grey is a locality in the Pilbara region of Western Australia, around 75 km east of Port Hedland, it connects a lot of rivers, such as Shaw River, Coongan River, and the East Strelley River.

Also within the locality is the De Grey homestead, and the De Grey River.
