= Tropical Cyclone Formation Alert =

Alert type used by the Joint Typhoon Warning Center

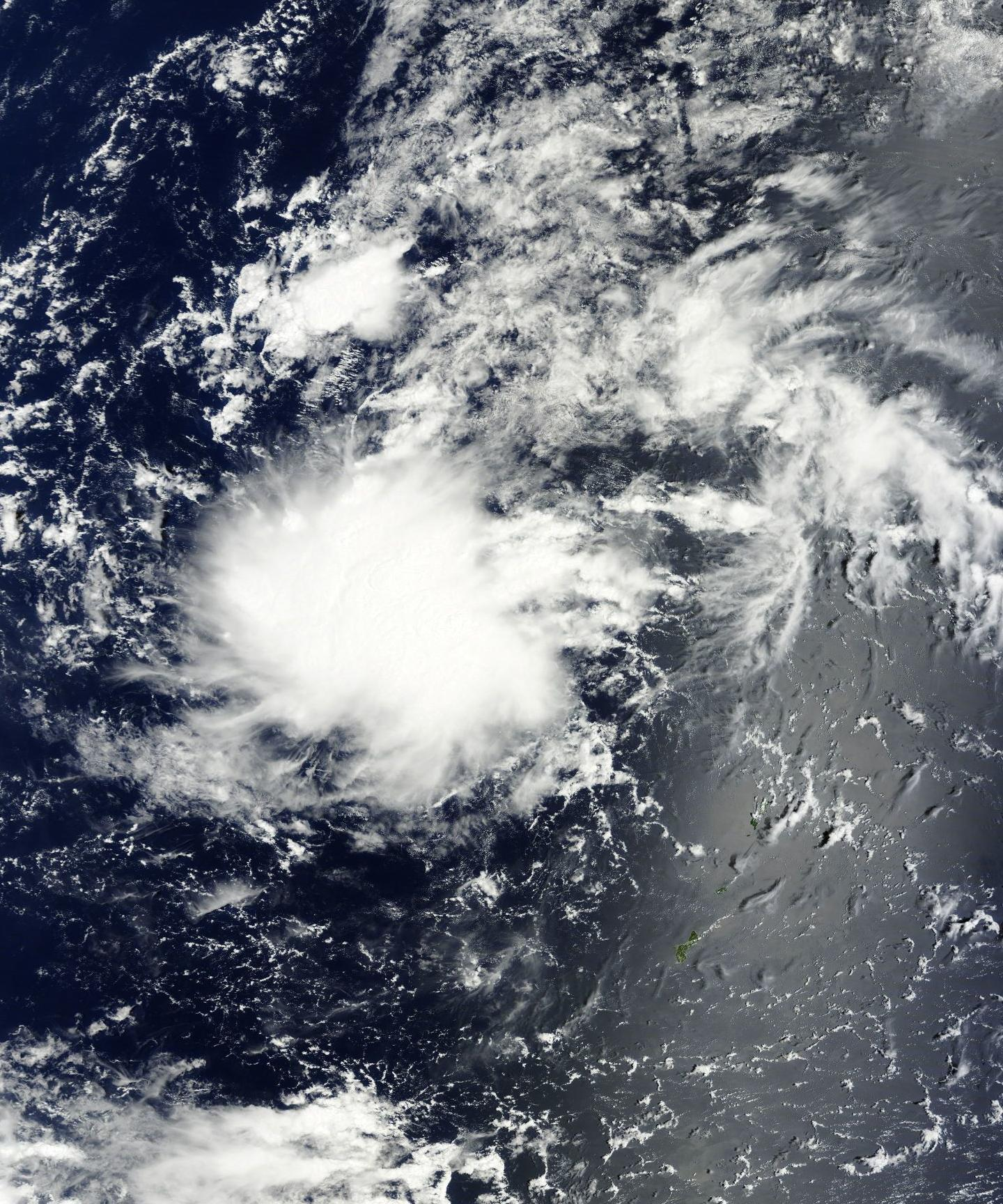
A TCFA was issued for this tropical disturbance, which later became Severe Tropical Storm Etau.

A Tropical Cyclone Formation Alert (TCFA) is a bulletin released by the U.S. Navy-operated Joint Typhoon Warning Center in Honolulu, Hawaii, or the Fleet Weather Center in Norfolk, Virginia, warning of the possibility of a tropical cyclone forming from a tropical disturbance that has been monitored. Such alerts are generally always issued when it is fairly certain that a tropical cyclone will form and are not always released before cyclogenesis, particularly if the cyclone appears suddenly. The TCFA consists of several different checks that are performed by the on-duty meteorologist of the system and its surroundings. If the condition being checked is met, a certain number of points are given to the system.

== Parts of the TCFA ==
=== Section 1 ===
The first section of the TCFA contains information on the area of the alert as well as the estimated center of the circulation. The estimated maximum sustained winds are provided as well.

=== Section 2 ===
The second section generally contains more specific information pertaining to the system. Information such as location relative to nearby cities or places of interest can usually be found in this section. Some of the reasoning for the issuance of the TCFA, which usually consists of recent changes in the system, can be found here. The section always ends with a statement as to the potential for development, which the JTWC will rank as either low, medium, or high (formerly poor, fair, or good).

=== Section 3 ===
This final section contains the time of the next bulletin on this system, which will update the system's progress over the elapsed time. The bulletin will be either another TCFA, a cancellation message, or the first advisory/warning on the system. The issuance of another TCFA would occur if the system remains in a state similar to its current state. A cancellation message would indicate that the likelihood of the system to develop into a tropical cyclone at the current time has decreased. An advisory would indicate that a tropical cyclone has indeed formed, and poses a future threat to the areas in the box defined in Section 1.

=== Sample alert ===
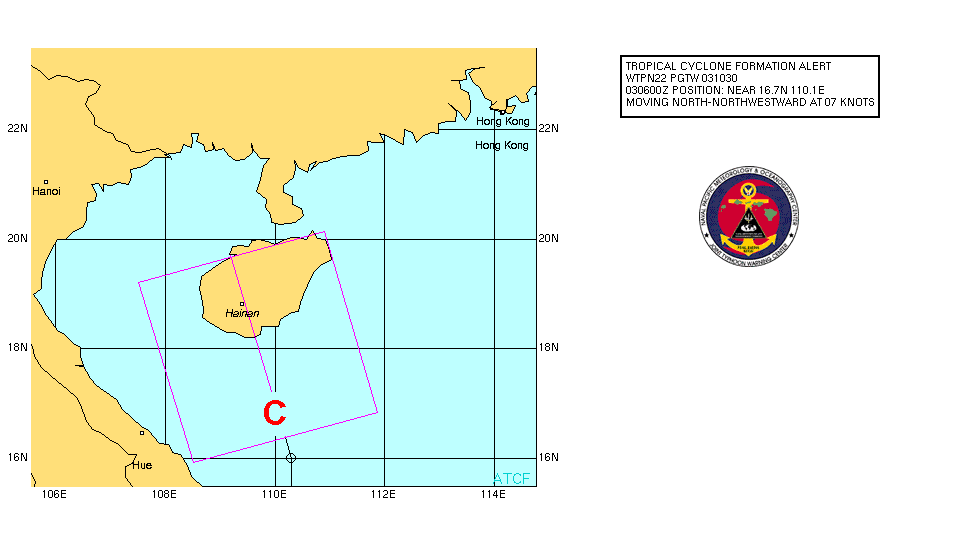
The TCFA graphic for this alert. No storm formed from this system.

WTPN22 PGTW 031030

MSGID/GENADMIN/NAVPACMETOCCEN PEARL HARBOR HI/JTWC//
SUBJ/TROPICAL CYCLONE FORMATION ALERT 031021Z JUL 06//
RMKS
1. FORMATION OF A SIGNIFICANT TROPICAL CYCLONE IS POSSIBLE WITHIN
100 NM EITHER SIDE OF A LINE FROM 16.4N 110.2E TO 19.7N 109.2E
WITHIN THE NEXT 12 TO 24 HOURS. AVAILABLE DATA DOES NOT JUSTIFY
ISSUANCE OF NUMBERED TROPICAL CYCLONE WARNINGS AT THIS TIME.
WINDS IN THE AREA ARE ESTIMATED TO BE 20 TO 25 KNOTS. METSAT IMAGERY
AT 030900Z INDICATES THAT A CIRCULATION CENTER IS LOCATED
NEAR 16.7N 110.1E. THE SYSTEM IS MOVING NORTH-NORTHWESTWARD AT
07 KNOTS.
2. REMARKS: THE AREA OF CONVECTION PREVIOUSLY LOCATED NEAR 16.3N
110.2E, IS NOW LOCATED NEAR 16.7N 110.1E, APPROXIMATELY 130 NM SOUTH-
SOUTHEAST OF HAINAN, CHINA. RECENT ANIMATED INFRARED IMAGERY SHOWS
CONVECTION HAS CONTINUED TO BECOME MORE CONSOLIDATED AND THERE IS NOW
NORTHERLY RETURN FLOW IN THE NORTHWESTERN QUADRANT OF SYSTEM. UPPER
LEVEL ANALYSIS INDICATES FAVORABLE EQUATORWARD OUTFLOW AND MODERATE
VERTICAL WIND SHEAR. MAXIMUM SUSTAINED SURFACE WINDS ARE ESTIMATED AT
20 TO 25 KNOTS. MINIMUM SEA LEVEL PRESSURE IS ESTIMATED TO BE NEAR
1003 MB. THE POTENTIAL FOR THE DEVELOPMENT OF A SIGNIFICANT TROPICAL
CYCLONE WITHIN THE NEXT 24 HOURS IS UPGRADED TO HIGH.
3. THIS ALERT WILL BE REISSUED, UPGRADED TO WARNING OR CANCELLED

BY 041030Z.//

== Issuance checklist ==
The JTWC and FWC-N follow a checklist when deciding whether or not to issue a TCFA on tropical disturbances. The checklist is updated every few years, and the JTWC checklist may differ slightly from the FWC-N checklist, which is shown below. If a system gets 35 to 38 points, a TCFA may be issued depending on Dvorak trends, and if a system gets 39 points or more a TCFA should be issued.

=== Surface ===
Condition	Points
A circulation is evident using visible satellite, shortwave infrared, microwave imagery or QuikSCAT/Windsat ambiguities	3 points
A circulation has been evident for at least 24 hours	5 points
A westerly surface- or gradient-level wind of 5 kn that is within 200 nmi (370 km, 230 mi) south of the centre of the disturbance	5 points
Any wind associated with the system is at least 20 kn	2 points
Any wind associated with the system is at least 25 kn	3 points
Any wind associated with the system is at least 30 kn	4 points
A weather station within 200 nm of the system has reported had a pressure drop of 2 mb over 24 hours	3 points
A weather station within 200 nmi of the system has had a pressure drop of 3 mb over 24 hours	4 points
The estimated MSLP of the system is less than 1010 to 1009 mb	3 points
The estimated MSLP of the system is 1008 mb or less	4 points

=== 500 mb height ===
Condition	Points
There is evidence of at least an inverted trough	2 points
There is evidence of a closed circulation in the system	4 points

=== 200 mb height ===
Condition	Points
Westerly flow of at least 15 kn over the disturbance	-4 points
There is evidence of anticyclonic outflow over the centre of the disturbance	4 points
Easterly flow of at most 20 kt over the disturbance	3 points

=== Sea surface temperature ===
Condition	Points
The sea surface temperature is 26 Celsius (78.8 Fahrenheit) or higher	3 points

=== Satellite data ===
Condition	Points
The system has persisted for at least 24 hours	3 points
The system has persisted for at least 48 hours	4 points
The system has persisted for at least 72 hours	5 points
The system has a Dvorak classification of T1.0 to T1.5 from all three agencies (TAFB, SAB, AFWA)	3 points
The system has a Dvorak classification of T1.5 to T2.0 from all three agencies	5 points
The Dvorak final-T number has decreased by T0.5 to T1.0 from two or more agencies	-2 points

=== Miscellaneous ===
Condition	Points
The cloud system is at least 5 degrees latitude away from the equator	3 points
The tropical system is within 72 hours of reaching a Department of Defense resource	3 points
The cloud system center and the satellite centre fixes for the system are within 2 degrees of each other	2 points

== See also ==
- National Hurricane Center, which normally issues advisories without a TCFA being issued if certain conditions are met.
