= 1984–85 South-West Indian Ocean cyclone season =

Cyclone season in the Southwest Indian Ocean

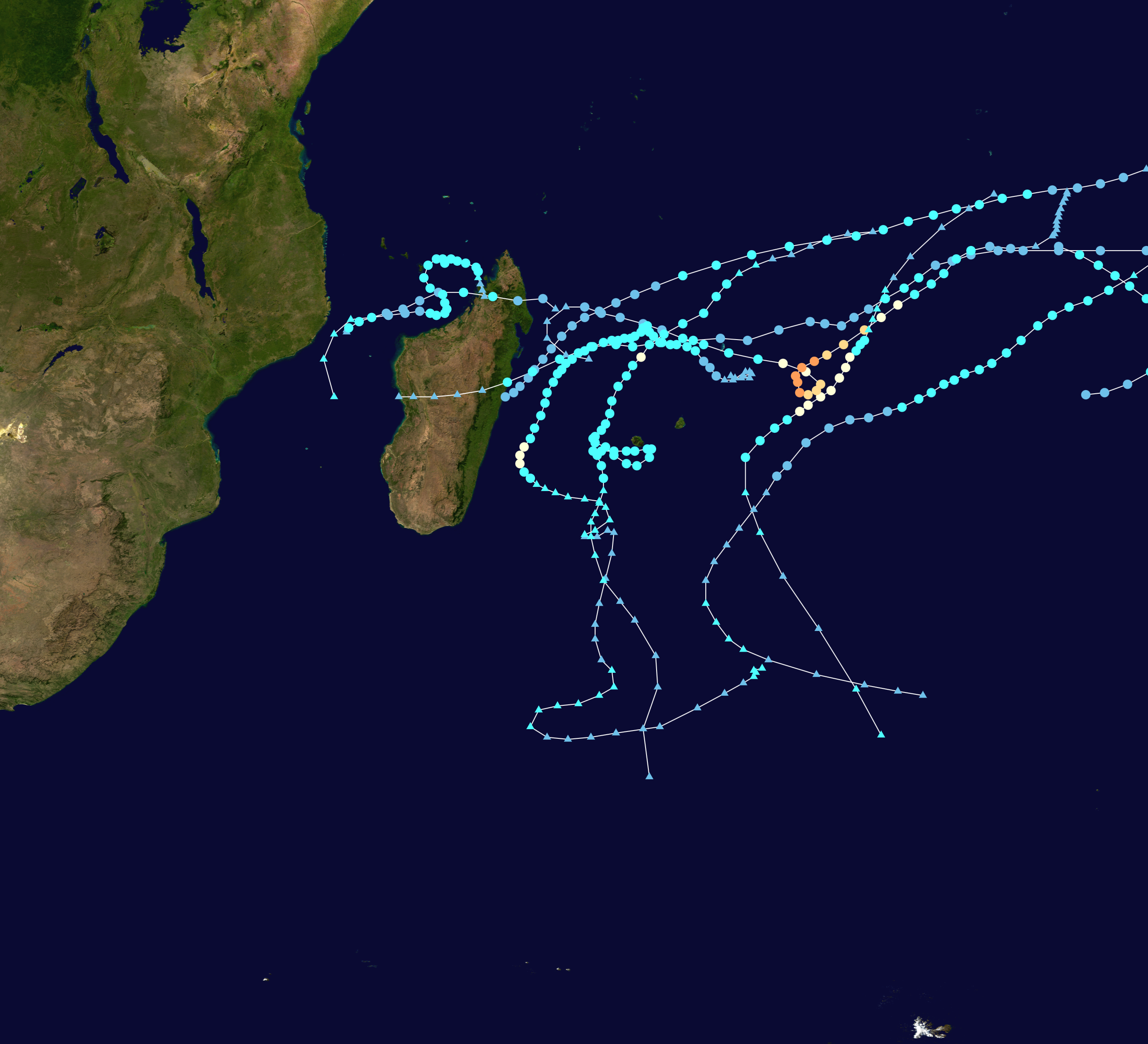
- Season summary map

Seasonal boundaries
- First system formed: November 9, 1984
- Last system dissipated: April 18, 1985

Strongest storm
- Name: Helisaonina
  - Maximum winds: 150 km/h (90 mph) (10-minute sustained)
  - Lowest pressure: 941 hPa (mbar)

Seasonal statistics
- Total disturbances: 8, 3 unofficial
- Total depressions: 8, 3 unofficial
- Total storms: 8, 2 unofficial
- Tropical cyclones: 1
- Total fatalities: Unknown
- Total damage: Unknown

Related articles
- 1984–85 Australian region cyclone season; 1984–85 South Pacific cyclone season

The 1984–85 South-West Indian Ocean cyclone season was an average cyclone season. Tropical cyclones in this basin are monitored by the Regional Specialised Meteorological Centre in Réunion. The first storm formed in mid-November, though it was not officially named. A few days later, the first official storm of the year (Anety) formed. In December, one storm formed. During January 1985, two tropical cyclones formed towards the end of the month. Three more systems developed in a short period of time in early to mid-February. After nearly two more months of inactivity, an unusually powerful late season storm developed (Helisaonina) in mid-April, which was the strongest storm of the year. While a number of storms during the season reached severe tropical storm status, only one of those intensified further. Even though two tropical cyclones this year made landfall, no known damage was recorded.

== Seasonal summary ==
During the season, advisories were issued by Météo-France's (MFR) meteorological office at Réunion. At the time, the MFR area of warning responsibility was from the coast of Africa to 80° E, and the agency primarily used the Dvorak technique to estimate the intensities of tropical cyclones. The Joint Typhoon Warning Center (JTWC), which is a joint United States Navy – United States Air Force task force that issues tropical cyclone warnings for the region, also tracked a long-lived tropical storm in November in addition to the 8 storms MFR named, which is comparable to the average of nine named storms per year. Following the season, the boundary for the basin was extended to 90° E.

== Systems ==
=== Tropical Storm 01S ===
- Tropical storm (SSHWS)
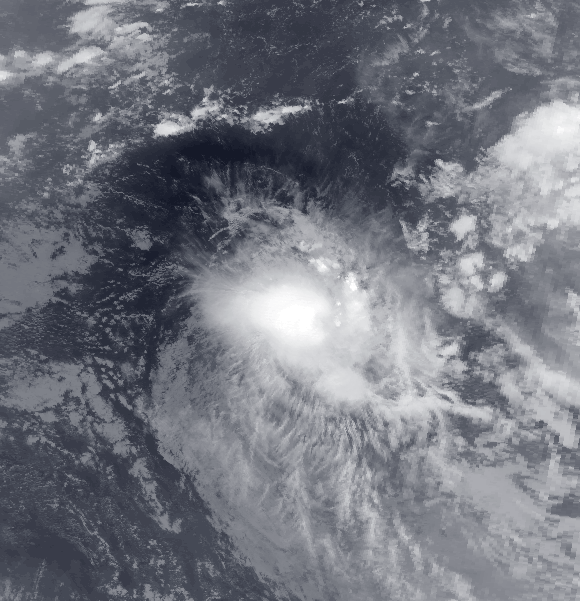
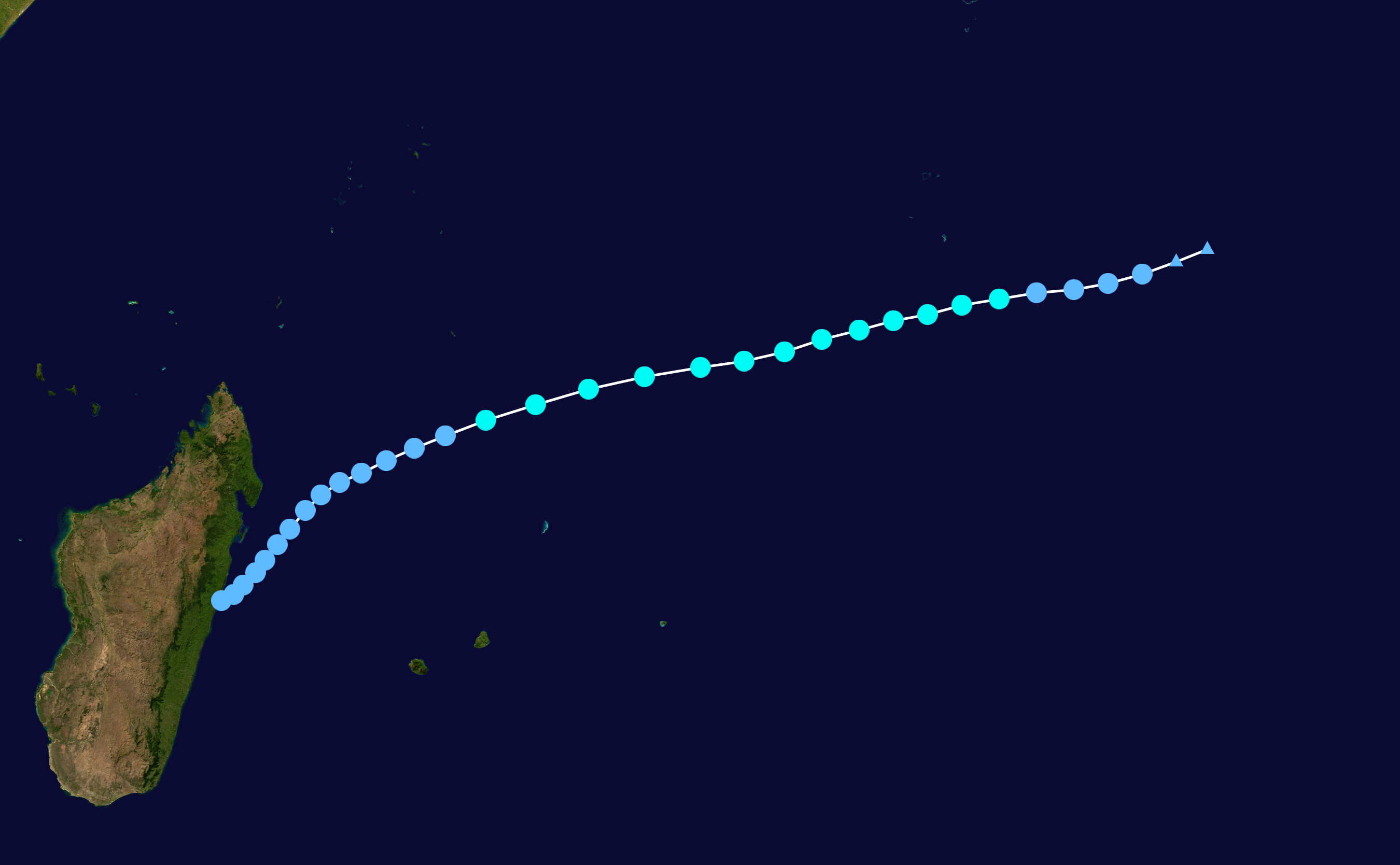
- Duration: November 9 – November 17
- Peak intensity: 85 km/h (50 mph) (1-min); 987 hPa (mbar)

According to the JTWC, a tropical depression formed on November 9 quite far from land. However, the system was never monitored by MFR. Tracking southwest throughout its lifetime, the JTWC upgraded the system into a tropical storm on November 11. Twelve hours later, the storm attained peak intensity of 50 mph (80 km/h). The storm gradually weakened, and at 00:00 UTC on November 14, it fell to a depression. On November 17, 01S was no more.

=== Moderate Tropical Storm Anety ===
- Moderate tropical storm (MFR)
- Tropical storm (SSHWS)
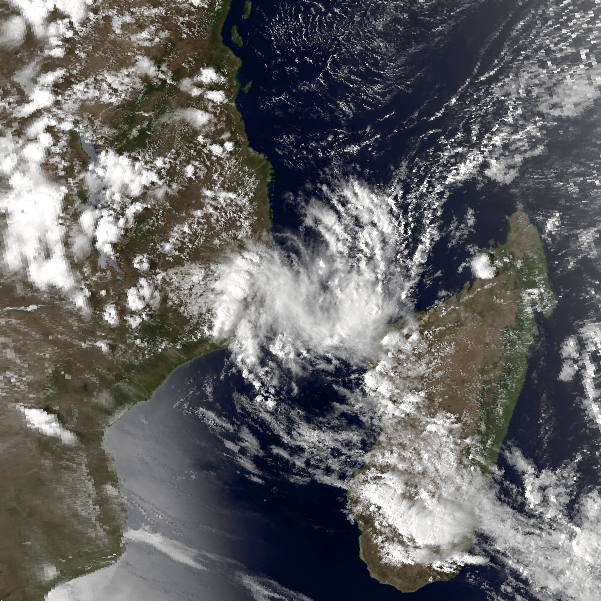
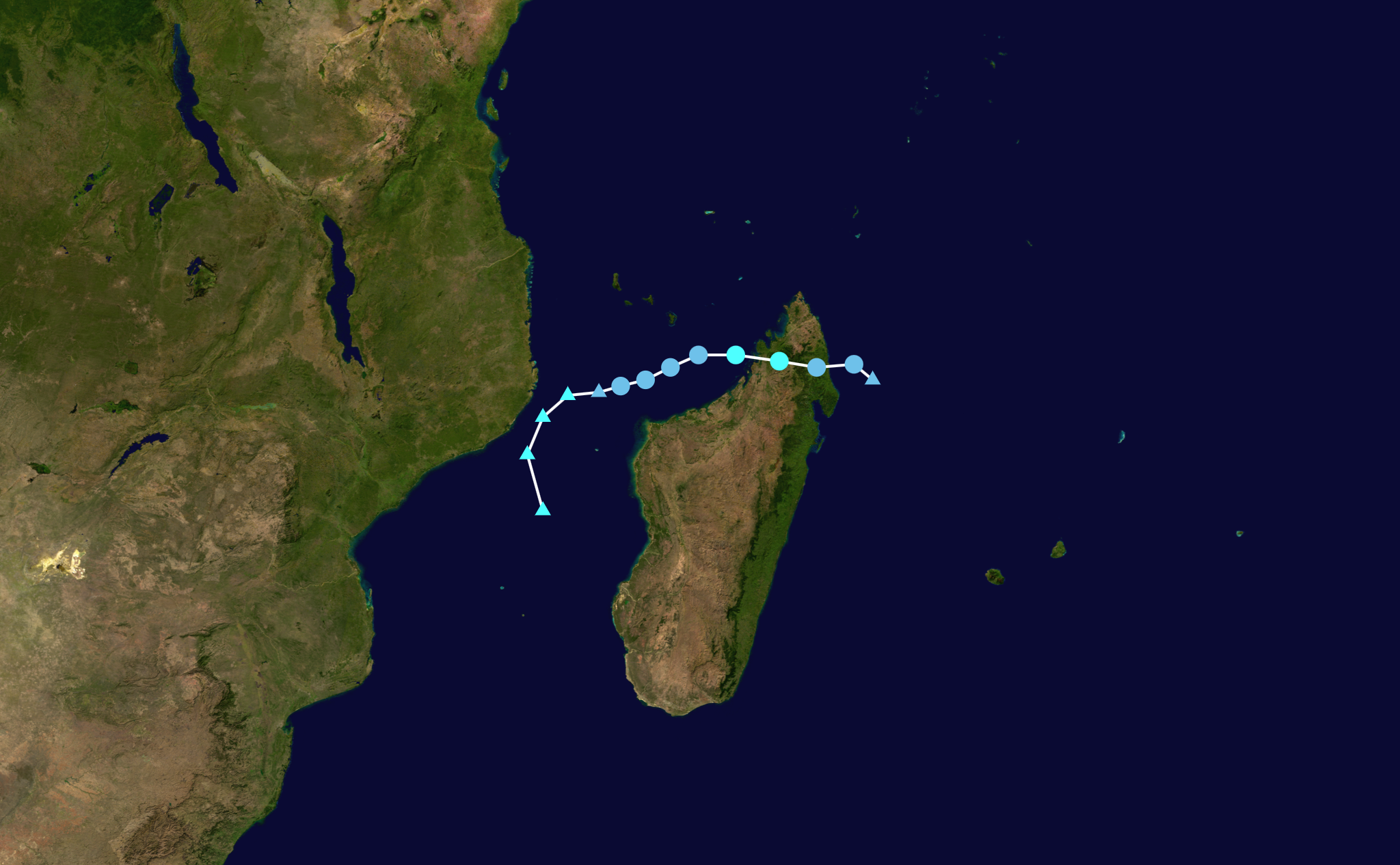
- Duration: November 20 – November 23
- Peak intensity: 65 km/h (40 mph) (10-min); 1003 hPa (mbar)

Early on November 20, the JTWC reported that a tropical depression had developed. Shortly thereafter, MFR reported that a tropical disturbance had formed. The low moved west-southwest while gradually deepening. Late on November 20, MFR upgraded the system into a moderate tropical storm. The storm failed to intensify further as it had moved onshore northern Madagascar. By November 21, MFR estimated that the storm weakened back into a disturbance. After emerging into the Mozambique Channel, Anety reportedly re-intensified back to moderate tropical storm status. While making its closest approach to the African mainland, the storm resumed weakening while turning back southeast. On November 23, both agencies stopped monitoring the system.

=== Moderate Tropical Storm Bobalahy ===
- Moderate tropical storm (MFR)
- Tropical storm (SSHWS)
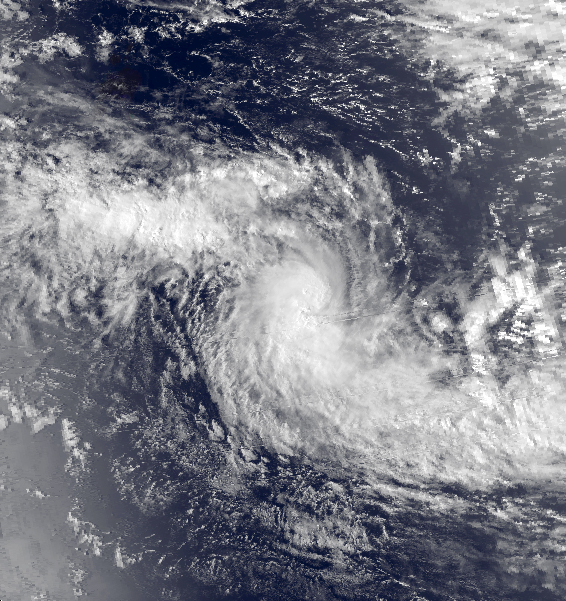
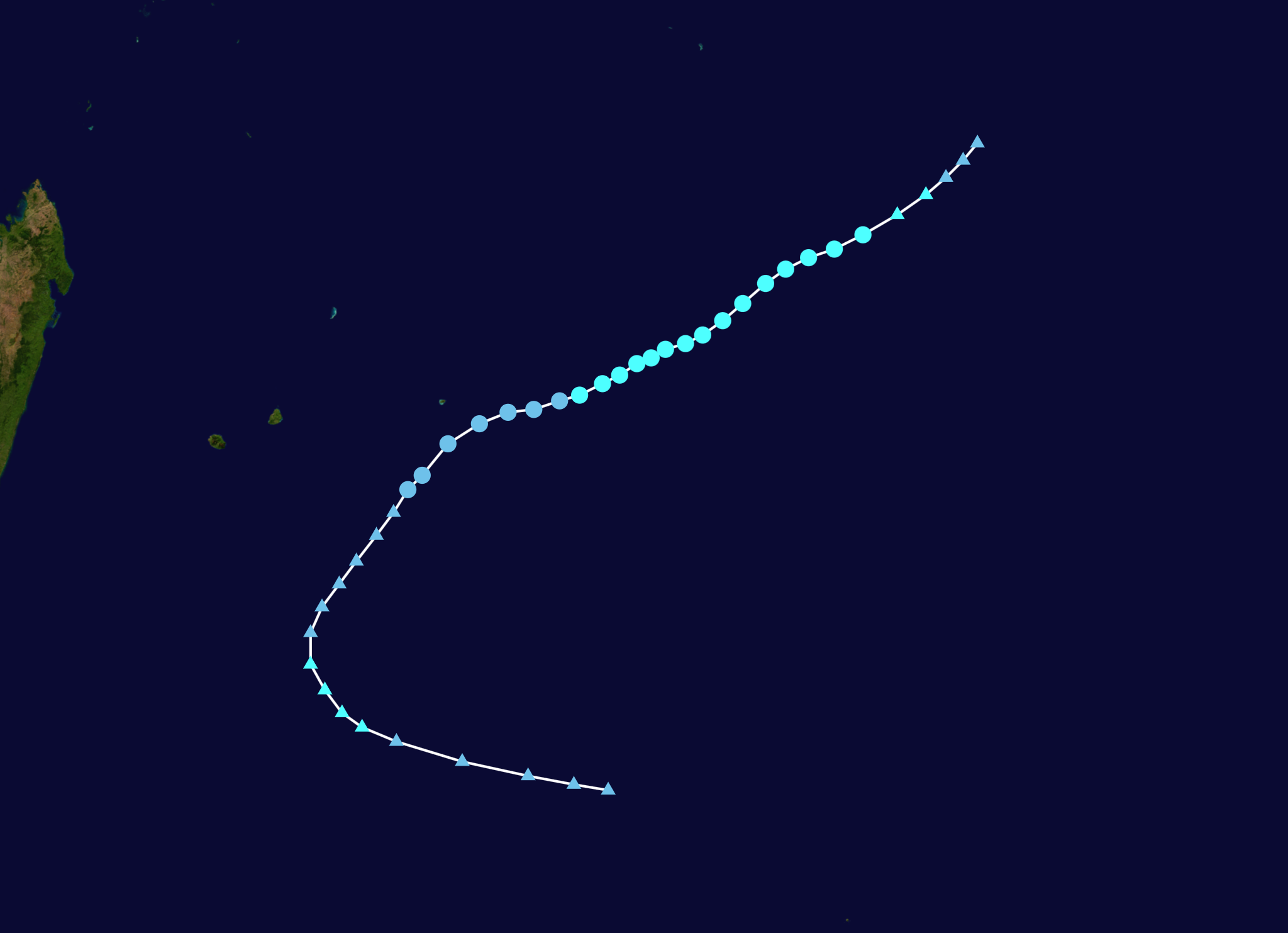
- Duration: December 2 – December 8
- Peak intensity: 80 km/h (50 mph) (10-min); 984 hPa (mbar)

During the morning hours of December 2, a tropical cyclone developed in extreme western portion of the Australian basin. After crossing the 80°E boundary that at that time separated the two basins the following day, MFR classified the system as a tropical depression. Early on December 4, the agency upgraded the system into a moderate tropical storm. Moving steadily southwest, it gradually intensified, only to turn west on December 5. That day, MFR reported that Moderate Tropical Storm Bobalahy had attained peak intensity of 45 mph (70 km/h). Around that time, the JTWC estimated that Bobalahy attained peak intensity of 65 mph (105 km/h). After maintaining peak intensity for a day or so, Bobalahy resumed a southwesterly path far from land while slowly weakening. On December 6, MFR downgraded the system into a tropical depression; the JTWC followed suit the next day. Now moving south-southwest, the JTWC stopped issuing advisories on the system as it had become extratropical. However, MFR continued to monitor the remnants of the system for four more days.

=== Severe Tropical Storm Celestina ===
- Severe tropical storm (MFR)
- Category 1 tropical cyclone (SSHWS)
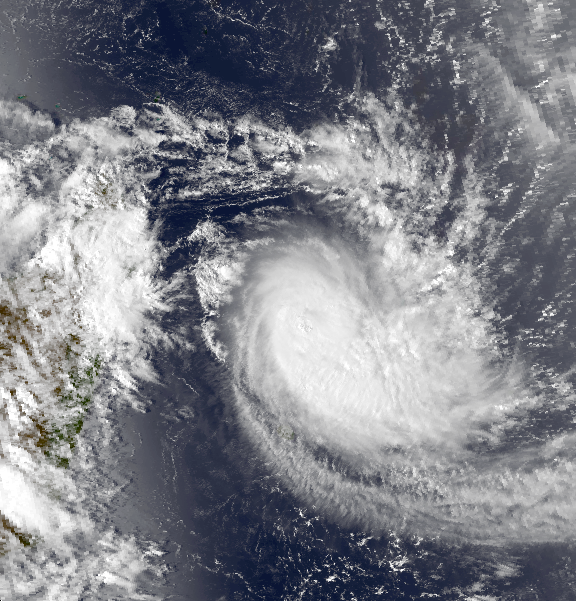
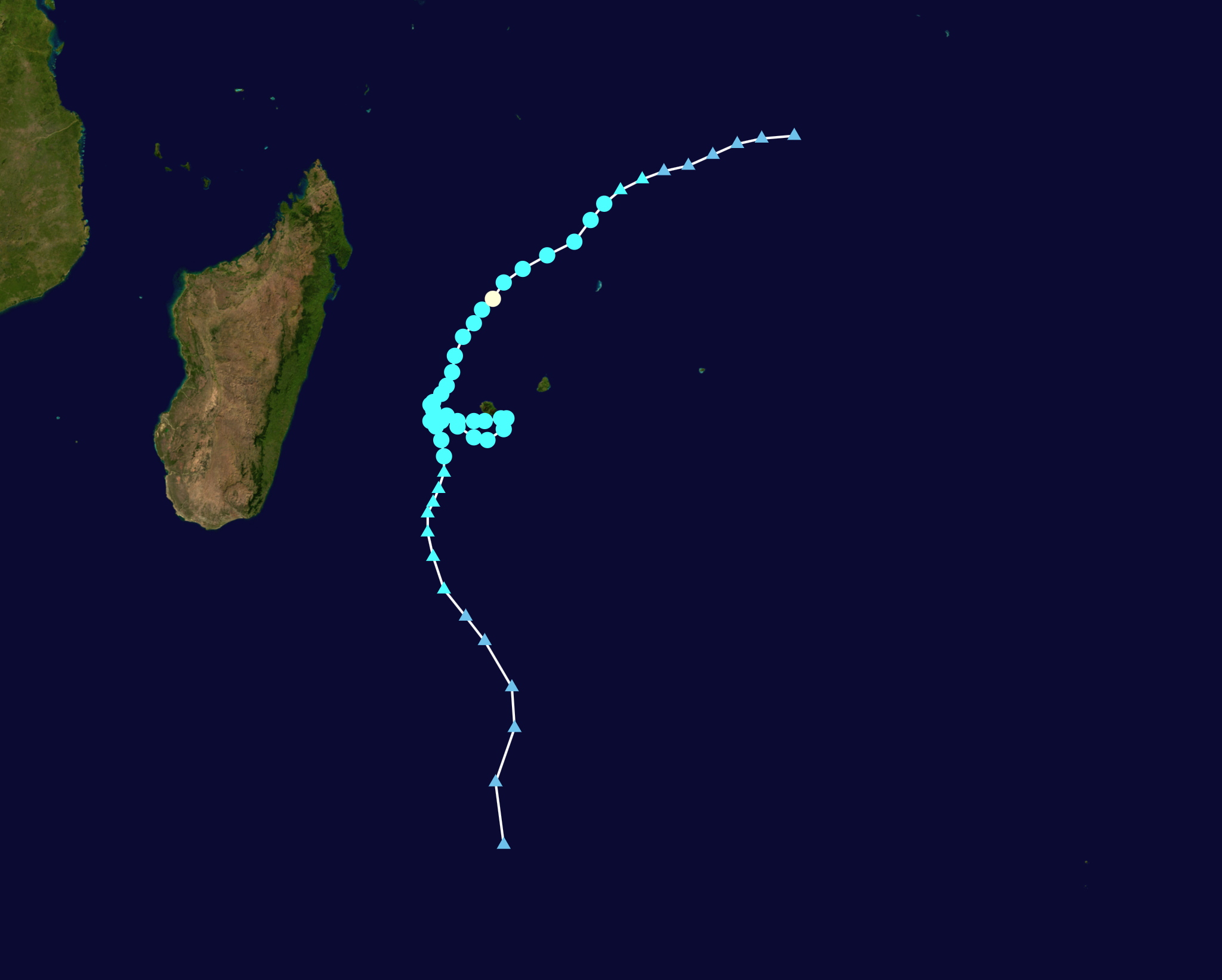
- Duration: January 12 – January 20
- Peak intensity: 95 km/h (60 mph) (10-min); 976 hPa (mbar)

Well away from land, the JTWC reported that a tropical disturbance developed on January 1. Initially, the storm remained weak, but later on January 11, the JTWC noted that the system had intensified into a tropical storm. Continuing to intensify, the storm moved towards the southwest. On January 12, MFR first classified the system; within six hours, it was declared a moderate tropical storm. As Celestina made a turn towards the south-southwest, MFR estimated that Celestina attained peak intensity as a severe tropical storm at 0600 UTC on January 13. According to the JTWC, the storm briefly developed hurricane-force winds; however, Celestina began to weakened thereafter. Moving south, Celestina was situated roughly 350 mi (565 km) east of Madagascar. Furthermore, on January 15, Celestina briefly re-intensified while undergoing a counterclockwise loop. By January 18, Celestina resumed a weakening trend; by that night, MFR downgraded the system into a tropical depression as it was now moving south-southwest. The storm was re-upgraded into a moderate tropical storm three days later, on January 21. However, this trend was short lived and that evening, the JTWC stopped monitoring the system. MFR followed suit at 0600 UTC on January 23. During its lifetime, Severe Tropical Storm Celestina brought rains to Reunion, peaking at 600 mm (25 in) in Trois-Bassins.

=== Tropical Depression 12S ===
- Tropical depression (SSHWS)
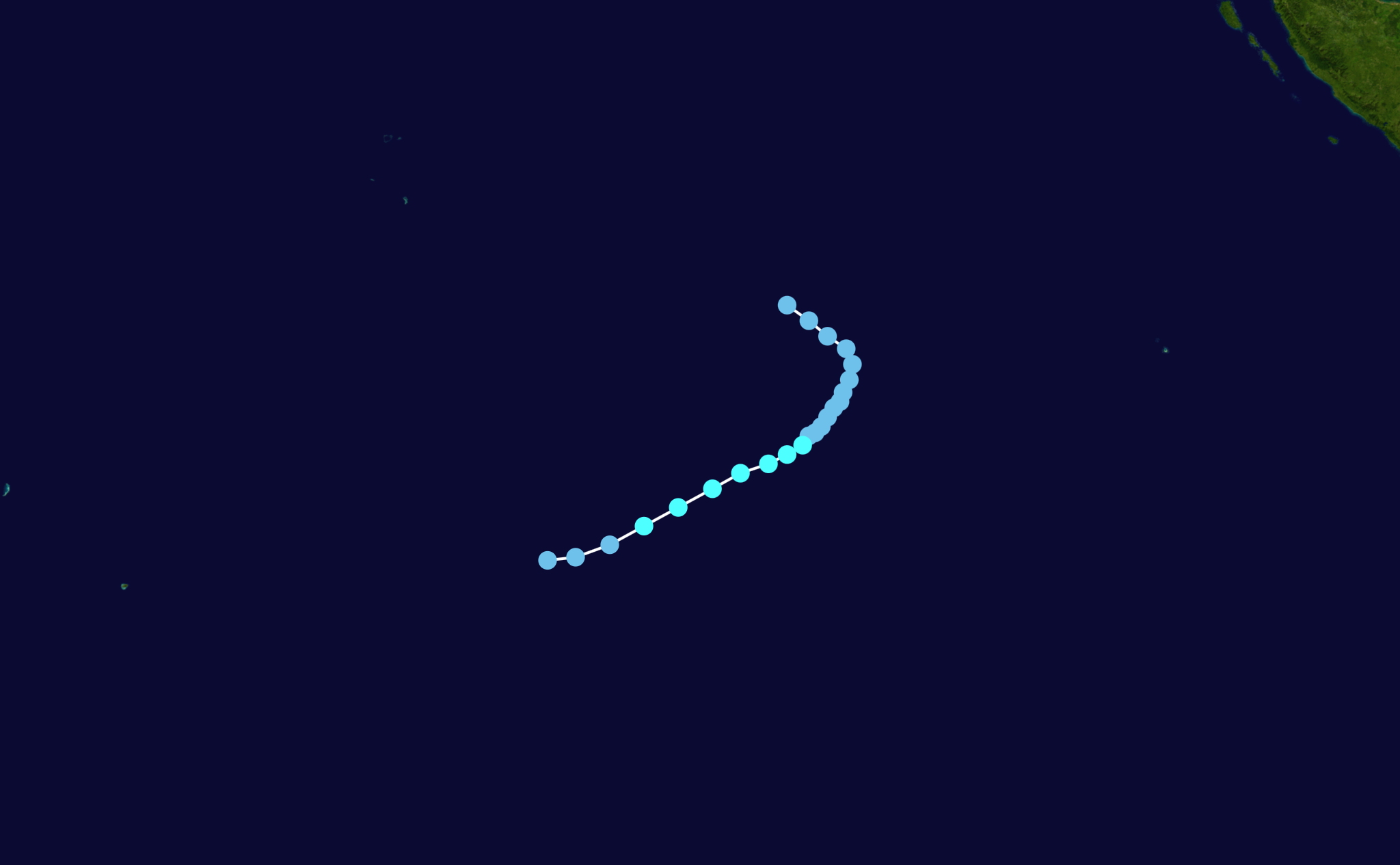
- Duration: January 17 (entered basin) – January 17
- Peak intensity: 55 km/h (35 mph) (1-min);

=== Severe Tropical Storm Ditra ===
- Severe tropical storm (MFR)
- Category 1 tropical cyclone (SSHWS)
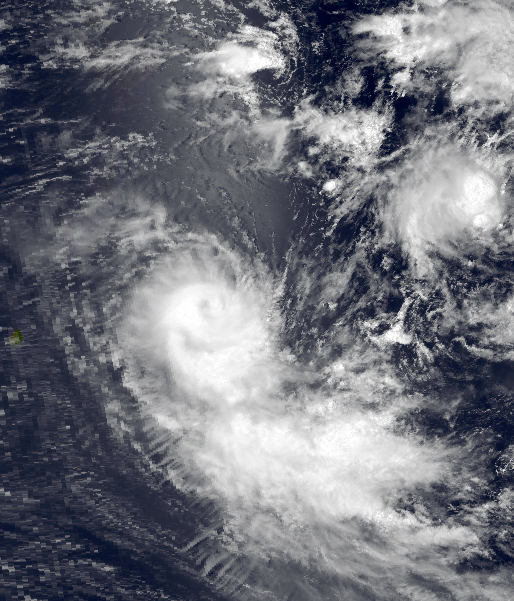
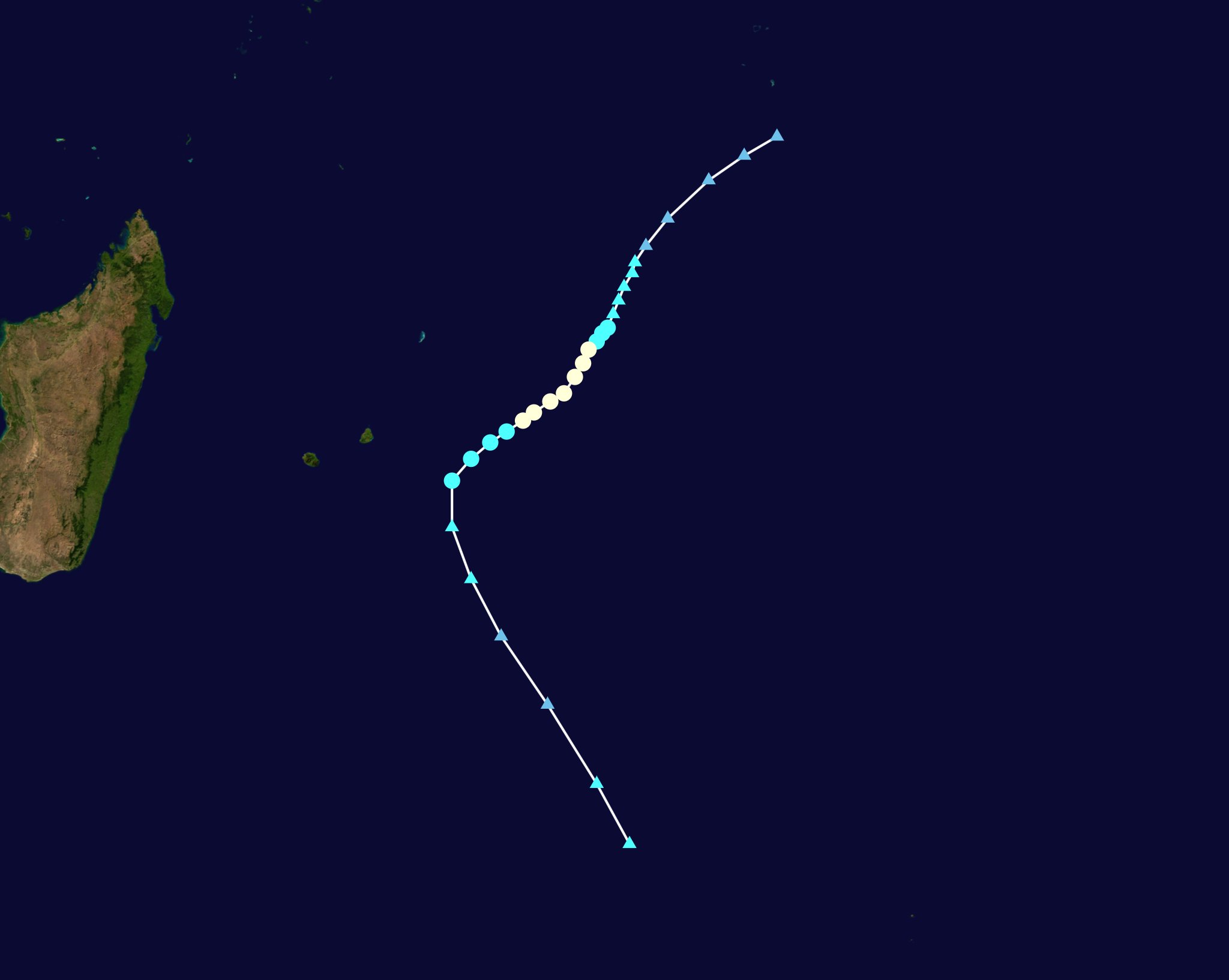
- Duration: January 27 – January 31
- Peak intensity: 115 km/h (70 mph) (10-min); 966 hPa (mbar)

Severe Tropical Storm Ditra originated from a tropical depression that the JTWC first warned on January 26. At first, the storm moved southwest, but once it developed gale-force winds, the system turned south. At 1800 UTC on January 27, MFR started monitoring the low; early the next morning, MFR upgraded the system into a moderate tropical storm. Twelve hours later, the JTWC estimated that Ditra had intensified into winds equal to a Category 1 on Saffir-Simpson hurricane wind scale (SSHWS). During the early morning hours of January 29, Ditra intensified into a severe tropical storm as the storm briefly turned west-southwest. Shortly thereafter, the JTWC announced that Ditra had attained its peak intensity of 80 mph (130 km/h). While the JTWC suggests that the storm gradually weakened during this time, MFR suggests that Ditra continued to intensify; they estimated that Ditra peaked in intensity on 0600 UTC January 30. Around this time, Ditra made its closet approach to Reunion, passing about 150 mi (240 km) south-southeast of the island. After maintaining this intensity for several hours, Ditra rapidly weakened as it accelerated to the southeast. It steadily weakened and late on January 31, the JTWC reportedly downgraded the system into a depression. Both agencies stopped monitoring Tropical Depression Ditra the following day. On January 29, Dirta passed just east of Rodrigues, bringing heavy rains.

=== Moderate Tropical Storm Esitera ===
- Moderate tropical storm (MFR)
- Tropical storm (SSHWS)
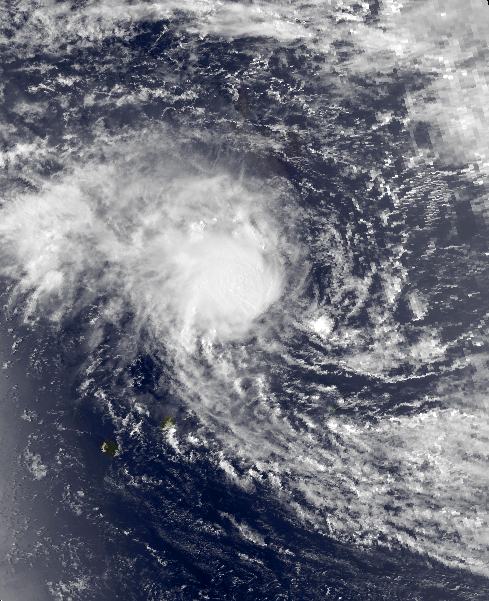
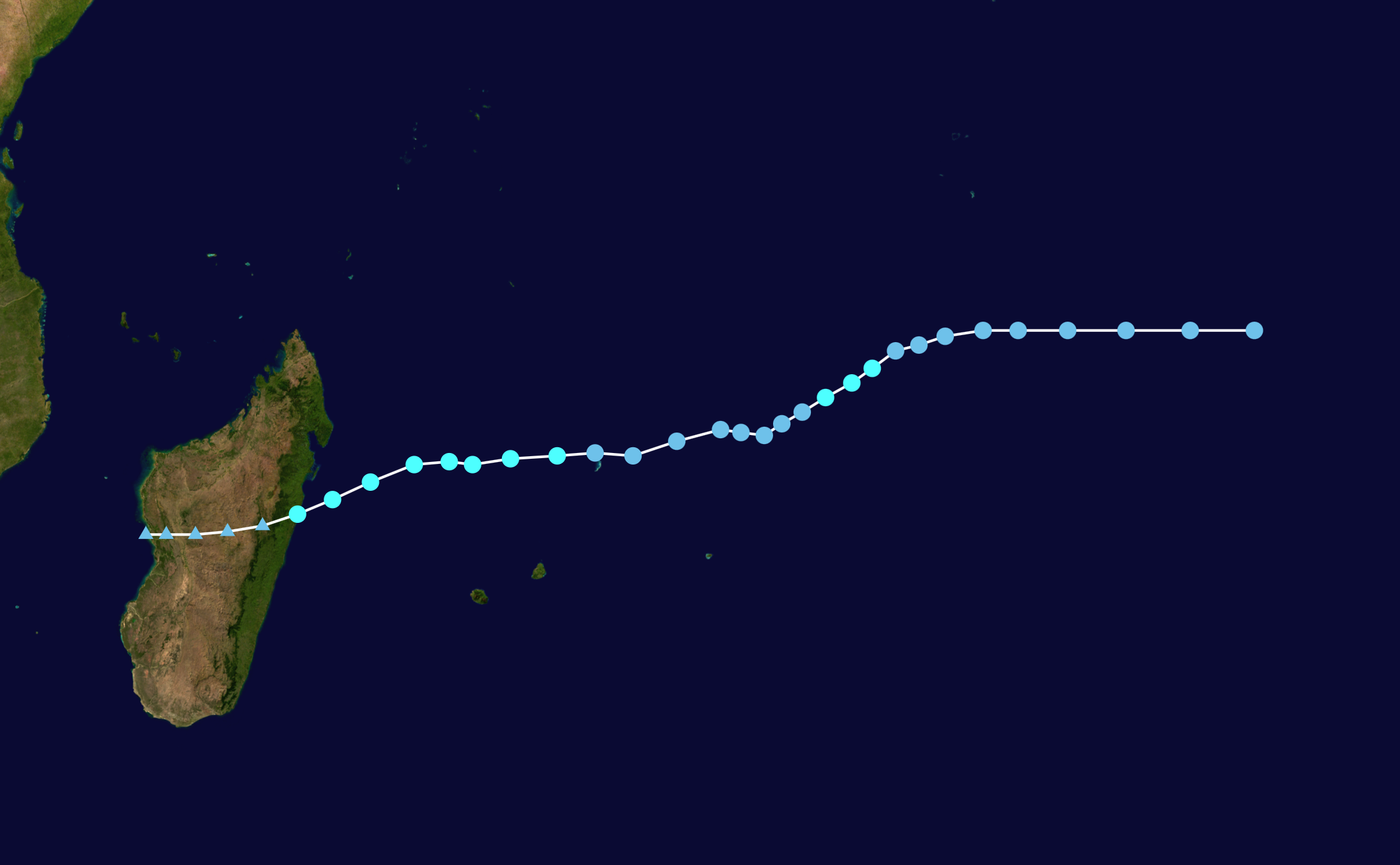
- Duration: February 3 – February 11
- Peak intensity: 80 km/h (50 mph) (10-min); 984 hPa (mbar)

On February 9, MFR first classified the system as a tropical depression about 400 mi (645 km) east of the northern tip of Madagascar. Never warned on by the JTWC, the storm moved southwest. After briefly weakening into a tropical disturbance, the storm suddenly re-intensified into a moderate tropical storm as Esitera re-curved to the southwest. On February 11, MFR stopped keeping an eye on the system.

=== Moderate Tropical Storm Gerimena ===
- Moderate tropical storm (MFR)
- Category 1 tropical cyclone (SSHWS)
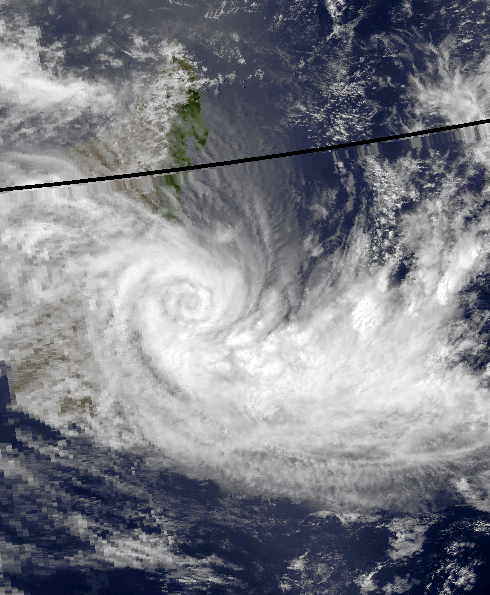
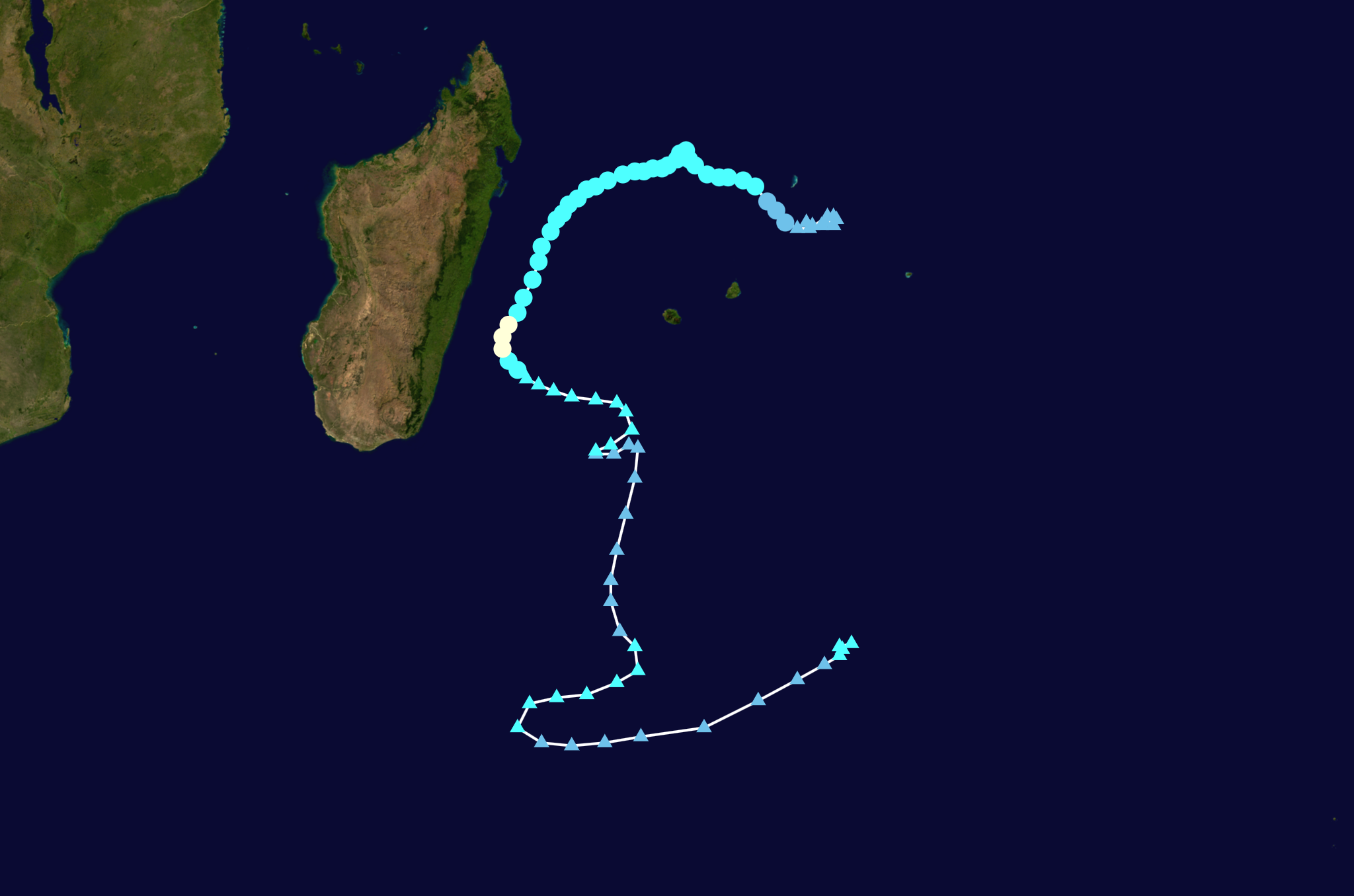
- Duration: February 11 – February 22
- Peak intensity: 80 km/h (50 mph) (10-min); 984 hPa (mbar)

On February 11, MFR reported that a moderate tropical storm formed over 700 mi (1,125 km) east of Reunion. The storm erratically drifted south for the two days when the JTWC declared the system a tropical depression. Subsequently, the system turned north-northwest and slowed. Data from the MF suggests that Moderate Tropical Storm Gerimena rapidly degenerated tropical disturbance before slowly re-intensifying; however, the JTWC suggests it gradually intensified. Before turning west, the JTWC upgraded the system into a tropical storm midday on February 14. According to the JTWC, Gerimena reached a secondary peak with winds of 50 mph (80 km/h) before weakening a little. Meanwhile, MFR upgraded the system back to moderate tropical storm status. Slowly intensifying, Gerimena turned south. Although the JTWC suggest that Gerimena briefly weakened on January 18 while turning east, data from MFR shows that Gerimena did not weaken until 1800 UTC February 19. On January 20, however, both agencies agree that Gerimena started to re-intensify. The next day, the JTWC reported that the storm intensified into a hurricane even though MFR suggests that the system was just a disturbance by that time. Not long after becoming a hurricane, the JTWC remarked that Cyclone Gerimena had attained peak intensity.

Shortly thereafter, data from the JTWC suggests that Gerimena weakened as it turned southeast. Then, it turned east-southeast. On February 24, Gerimena briefly level off in intensity while turning back to south. Furthermore, the JTWC stopped keeping an eye on Gerimena at 0000 UTC on February 26 as the storm re-curved east. However, MFR continued to track Gerimena until March 4 as it fluctuated in intensity.

For several days, the storm dropped heavy rainfall on Réunion, reaching 756 mm (29.8 in).

=== Severe Tropical Storm Feliska ===
- Severe tropical storm (MFR)
- Tropical storm (SSHWS)
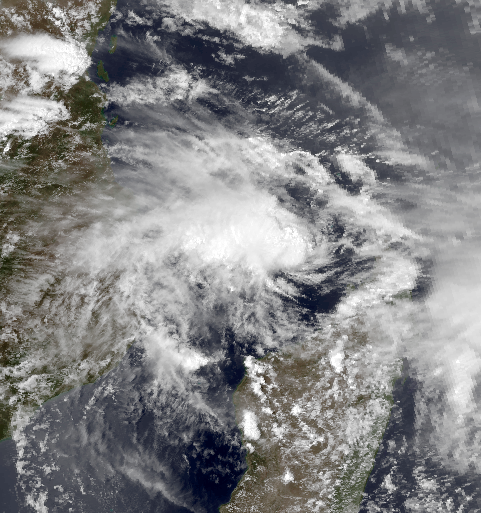
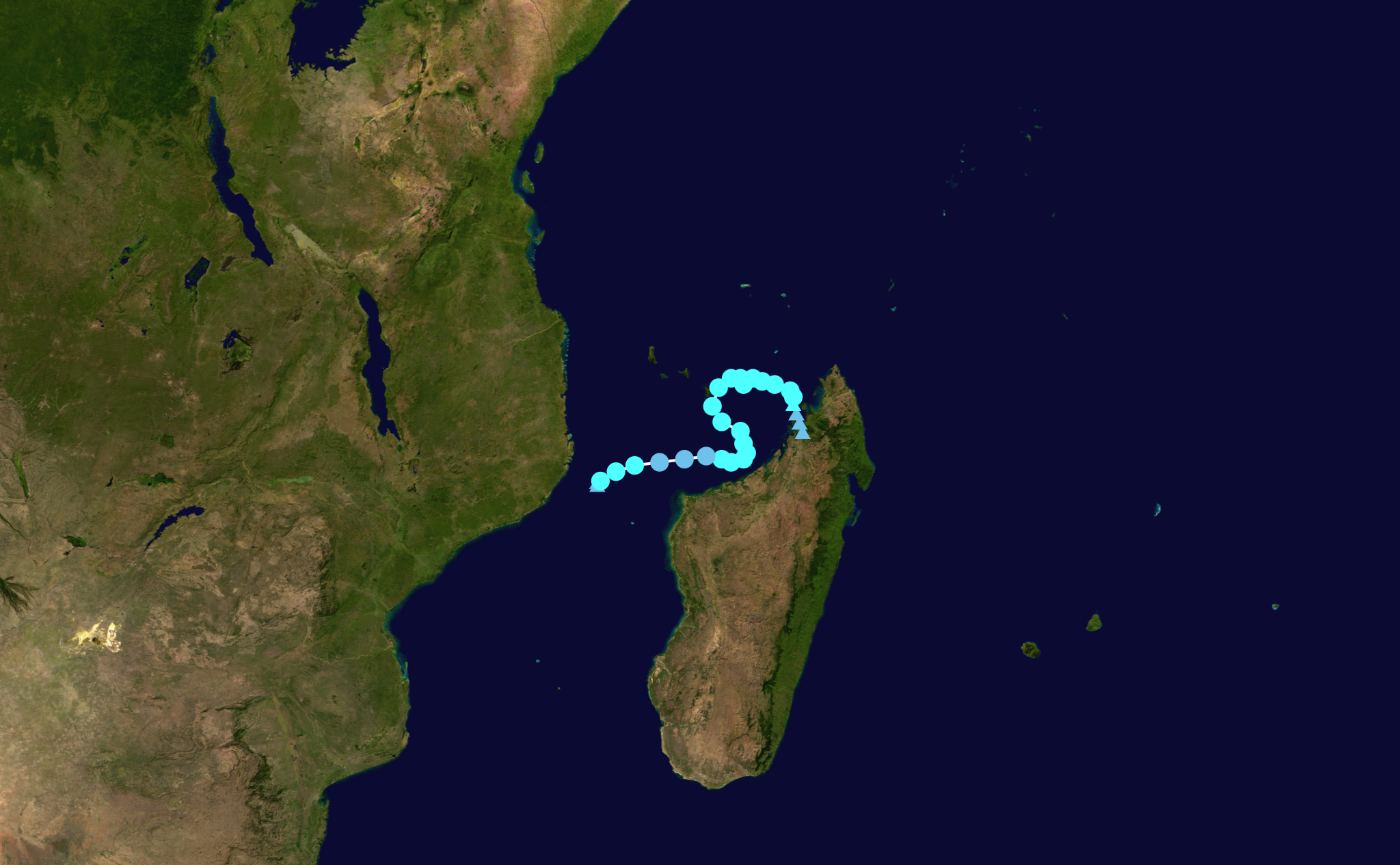
- Duration: February 12 – February 18
- Peak intensity: 95 km/h (60 mph) (10-min); 976 hPa (mbar)

On February 12, MFR first designated what would later become Feliska while it was centered north of the Mozambique Channel. The next day, MFR downgraded Feliska into a tropical depression. Hours later, the JTWC first monitored the system. Drifting east, the depression gradually intensified. MFR reported that the system regained moderate tropical storm intensity at 1800 UTC that day. Early on February 13, the JTWC upgraded Feliska into a tropical storm as it turned north. While slowing gaining strength, Feliska turned east. By 0000 UTC February 16, MFR declared that Feliska attained peak intensity. Moreover, the JTWC suggested that Feliska had peaked in intensity, with winds of 60 mph (95 km/h). Thereafter, Feliska turned south and start a slow weakening trend. On February 17, Feliska briefly weakened into a tropical depression. That night Feliska was re-upgraded into a moderate tropical storm as it made landfall along northeastern Madagascar. At that time of landfall, the JTWC estimated that Feliska was still a tropical storm. After moving inland, MFR stopped monitoring the system, though the JTWC kept tracking Feliska for another 24 hours as it headed southeast.

=== Tropical Storm 25S ===
- Tropical storm (SSHWS)
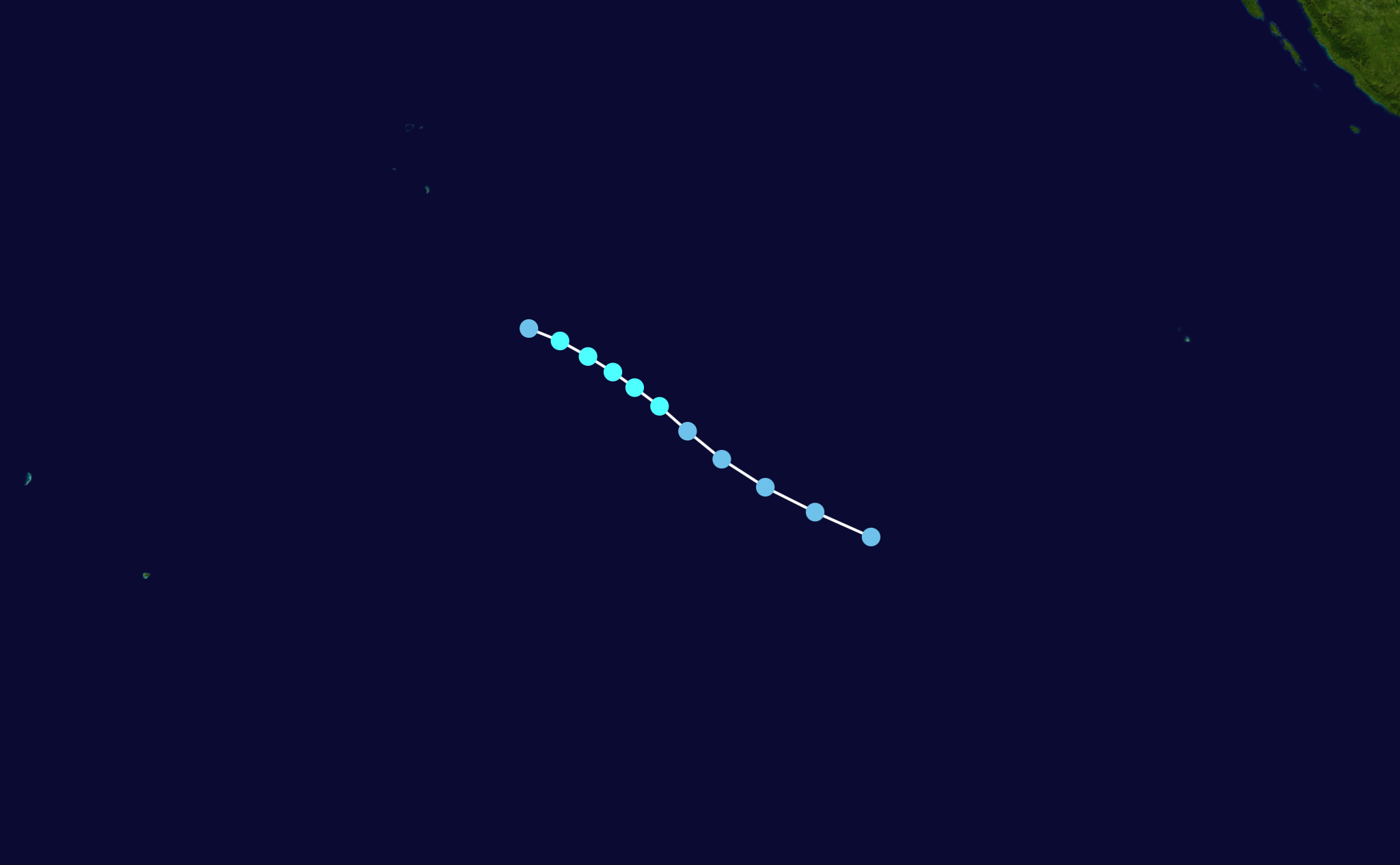
- Duration: February 18 – February 19 (exited basin)
- Peak intensity: 65 km/h (40 mph) (1-min);

=== Tropical Cyclone Helisaonina ===
- Tropical cyclone (MFR)
- Category 3 tropical cyclone (SSHWS)
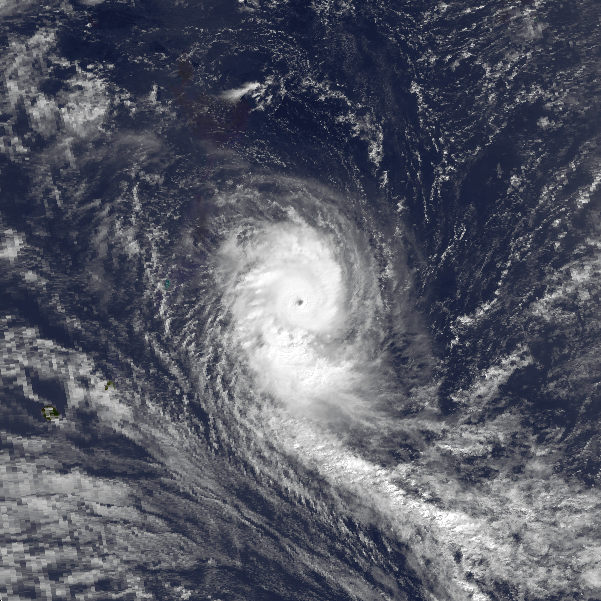
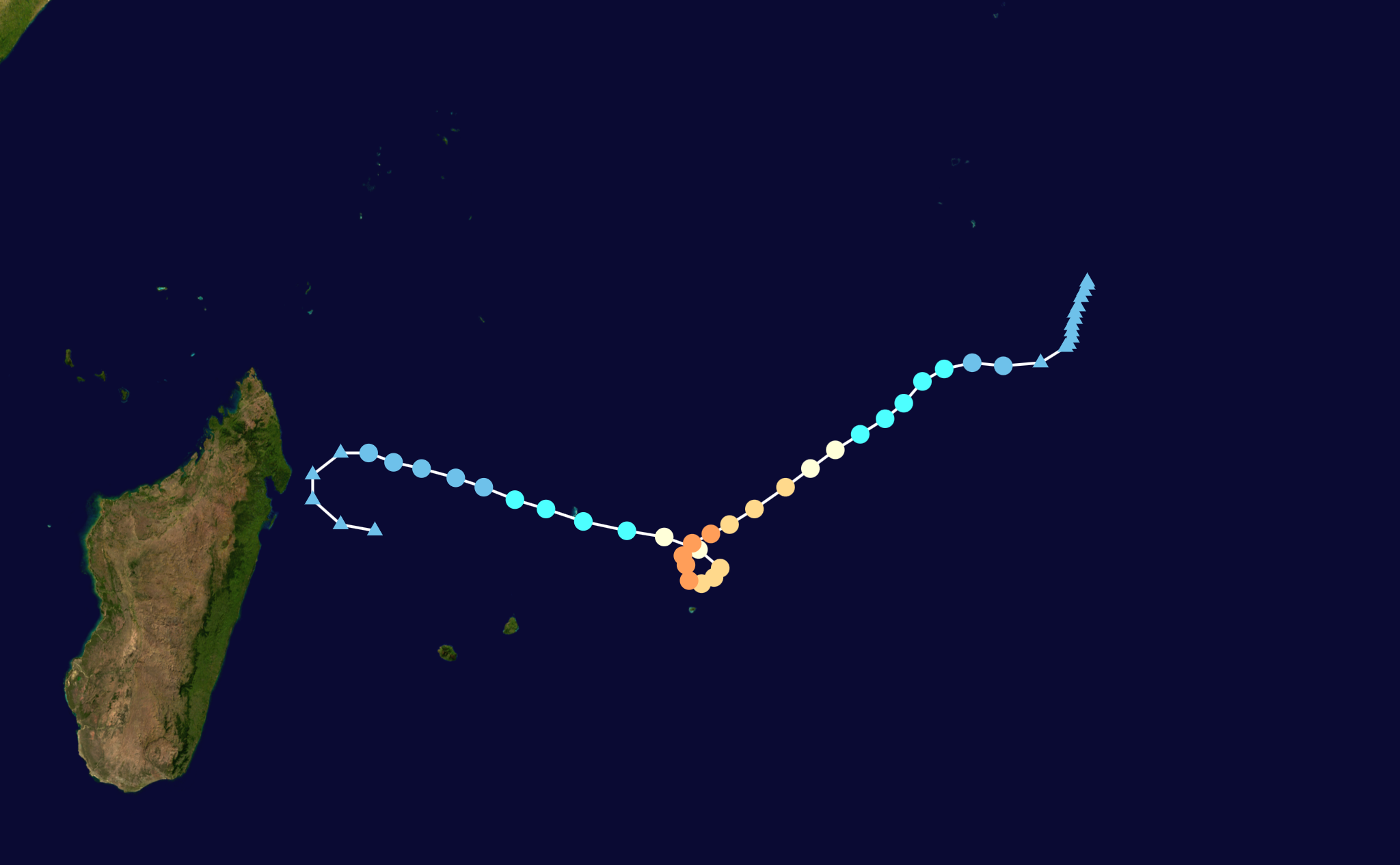
- Duration: April 10 – April 18
- Peak intensity: 150 km/h (95 mph) (10-min); 941 hPa (mbar)

On April 10, MFR reportedly classified a low far from any land masses. Later that day, the JTWC upgraded Helisaonina into a tropical depression after turning from west to southwest. On April 11, MFR upgraded the system into a Severe Tropical Storm. At 0600 UTC the next day, the JTWC upgraded the system into a hurricane while MFR upgraded the system into tropical cyclone intensity. That evening, the JTWC announced that it had developed winds equivalent to Category 2 intensity. Two days after becoming a severe tropical storm, on April 13, the JTWC upgraded Helisaonina to the equivalent to a Category 3 hurricane. While undergoing a counterclockwise loop, the JTWC reported that Cyclone Helisaonina had peaked in intensity with 120 mph (195 km/h) winds. At that time, 000 UTC April 14, MFR estimated it attained peak wind speed, with winds of 90 mph (145 km/h).

After attaining peak intensity, the storm weakened rapidly as it began to move west-northwest. Later that morning, MFR downgraded the system into a severe tropical storm. By April 15, MFR downgraded the system into a tropical depression. That very day, the JTWC reported that winds of Helisaonina had fallen below hurricane-force. During the morning hours of April 17, the JTWC downgraded Helisaonina into a depression. Shortly thereafter, MFR stopped monitoring the system. After re-curving just east of Madagascar, Helisaonina dissipated according to the JTWC on April 18. While the storm was looping close to Rodrigues, it produced wind gusts of 117 km/h (73 mph).

== See also ==
- Atlantic hurricane seasons: 1984, 1985
- Eastern Pacific hurricane seasons: 1984, 1985
- Western Pacific typhoon seasons: 1984, 1985
- North Indian Ocean cyclone seasons: 1984, 1985
