= Pressure–wind relationship calculations for tropical cyclones =

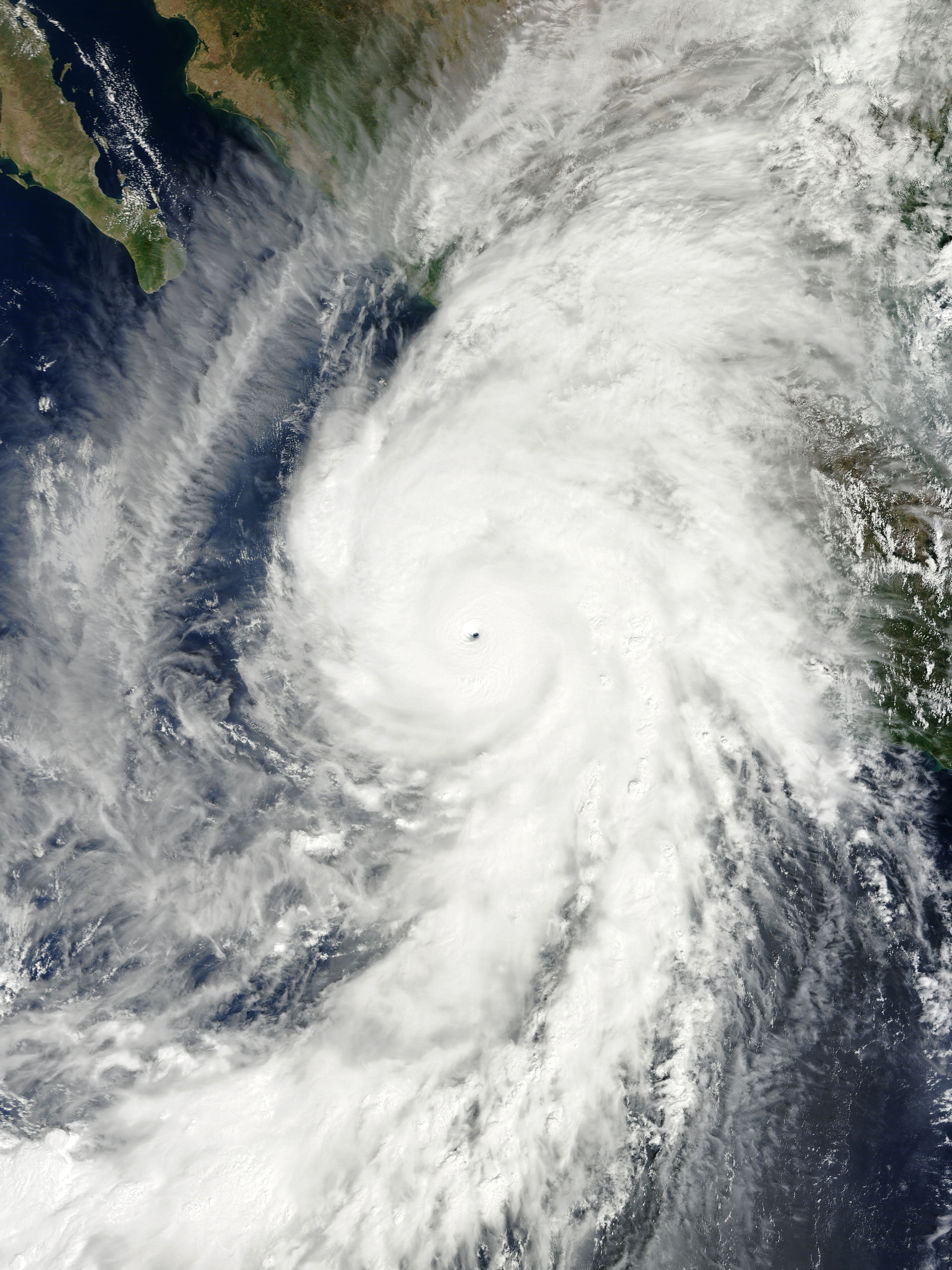
Hurricane Patricia had the second-lowest pressure and highest wind speeds ever recorded in a tropical cyclone.

There are several different methods to derive pressure from wind speed and vice versa in tropical cyclones. Both information minimum pressure and wind speed have their utilities. Wind speed can describe the destructive potential of a tropical cyclone.

== Method ==
A tropical cyclone's maximum sustained wind and minimum central air pressure are interlinked and can be used to describe a tropical cyclone's intensity. While the maximum winds are more closely related to the destructive potential of a tropical cyclone, it is harder to reliably measure. These winds can be estimated from both the radius of maximum winds and the pressure gradient, but this gradient is also difficult to measure. Over water, reconnaissance flights can sample a tropical cyclone's central pressure, and reliable pressure observations over land from within the eye are more likely to be retrieved than wind observations from the eyewall. According to Christopher Burt from Weather Underground, the most reliable method of estimating pressure from wind involves using the Dvorak technique with an image, which shows how cold cloud tops are. Joe Courtney and John Knaff noted that as several models are based on Atlantic data, leading to biases in other parts of the world. Most pressure-wind models are in the form of:

$$v_m=a\Delta p^x$$

where $v_m$ is the maximum wind speed, $\Delta p$ is the change in pressure from an external point to the center, and $a$ and $x$ are constants. This is termed the "cyclostrophic equation". Ted Fujita was the first to modify the exponent; before then, it mostly stood at 0.5. The efficacy of wind–pressure relationships is affected by other factors such as the storm's latitude and size, as well as the local atmospheric environment.

== Models ==
=== Knaff-Zehr ===
Knaff and Zehr (2007) came up with the following formula to relate wind and pressure, taking into account movement, size, and latitude:

$MSLP=23.286-0.483 V_{srm}-( \frac{V_{srm}}{24.254} )-12.587S-0.483\phi+P_{env'}$

Where V_{srm} is the max wind speed corrected for storm speed, phi is the latitude, and S is the size parameter. S is more specifically defined as the ratio of tangential wind at a radius of 500 kilometres (310 mi) to its value under a Rankine vortex model.

=== Holland ===
In 2008, Greg Holland published his model to the Monthly Weather Review. The Holland model is able to characterize the pressure profile of a tropical cyclone with accuracy.

=== Knaff-Zehr-Courtney ===
Joe Courtney and John A. Knaff published in 2009 a correction to the previous Knaff-Zehr model. They noted that the Knaff-Zehr model had issues with calculating for storms at low latitudes. The equation derived is:

$P_c=23.286 - 0.483V_{srm1} - (V_{srm1}/24.254)^2 - 12.587S - 0.483\Phi + P_e$ (for $\Phi>18^\circ$)

$P_c=5.962 - 0.267V_{srm1} - (V_{srm1}/18.26)^2 - 6.8S$ (for $\Phi<18^\circ$)

== Usage ==
The interchangeability of pressure and wind allows for the two to be used to give equivalencies for the public. Pressure-wind relations can be used when information is incomplete, in situations where forecasters must rely on the Dvorak technique. These situations can also include reexaminations of past tropical cyclones where little or incomplete data may exist. For example, many systems in HURDAT only consist of wind speed and not pressure measurements.

Some storms may have particularly high or low pressures that do not match with their wind speed. For example, Hurricane Sandy had a lower pressure than expected with its associated peak wind speed.

== See also ==
- Hebert-Poteat technique
- Proxy (climate)
- Proxy (statistics)
- Saffir–Simpson scale
