= Vernon Dvorak =

American meteorologist (1928–2022)

Vernon F. Dvorak
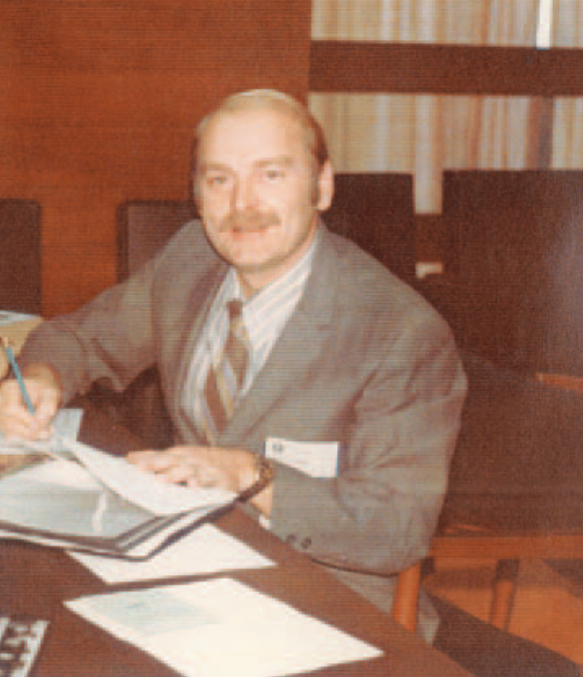
- Dvorak in the 1970s
- Born: November 15, 1928; Cedar Rapids, Iowa, U.S.
- Died: September 19, 2022 (aged 93); Ojai, California, U.S.
- Education: University of California, Los Angeles
- Known for: Developing the Dvorak technique
- Awards: United States Department of Commerce Meritorious Service award (1972); National Weather Association Lifetime Achievement (2002)
- Scientific career
- Fields: Meteorology
- Thesis: An investigation of the inversion-cloud regime over the subtropical waters west of California (1966)

Vernon Francis Dvorak (November 15, 1928 – September 19, 2022) was an American meteorologist. He studied meteorology at the University of California, Los Angeles and wrote his Master thesis An investigation of the inversion-cloud regime over the subtropical waters west of California in 1966. In 1973 he developed the Dvorak technique to analyze tropical cyclones from satellite imagery. He worked with the National Environmental Satellite, Data, and Information Service. He lived in Ojai, California, until his death on September 19, 2022.

== Life and career ==
Vernon Francis Dvorak was born in Cedar Rapids, Iowa on November 15, 1928.

Dvorak's most influential work was the creation of the Dvorak technique, a method of estimating tropical cyclone intensity using infrared satellite. The Dvorak technique is credited as "fundamentally [enhancing] the ability to monitor tropical cyclones on a global scale." The method provides an invaluable tool in monitoring these systems given the limitations of direct measurements on such a vast scale.

Dvorak married Joanne Foyola Schafroth in Los Angeles in January 1958. He died on September 19, 2022, at the age of 93.

=== Selected works ===
- Dvorak, Vernon F. (February 1973). A technique for the analysis and forecasting of tropical cyclone intensities from satellite pictures (Technical report). NOAA Technical Memorandum NESS. 45.
- Dvorak, Vernon F. (September 1984). Tropical cyclone intensity analysis using satellite data (Technical report). NOAA Technical Memorandum NESDIS. 11.
- Jixi, Jiang; Dvorak, Vernon F. (May 1987). Tropical cyclone center locations from enhanced infrared satellite imagery (Technical report). NOAA Technical Memorandum NESDIS. 18.
- Dvorak, Vernon F.; Mogil, H. Michael (1994). Tropical cyclone motion forecasting using satellite water vapor imagery (Technical report). NOAA Technical Memorandum NESDIS. 83.

== Awards ==
Dvorak was a recipient of a United States Department of Commerce Meritorious Service award in 1972 and in 2002 he received a Special Lifetime Achievement Award from the National Weather Association.

== See also ==
- Dvorak technique
