= Hebert-Poteat technique =

Subjective technique to estimate subtropical cyclone intensity

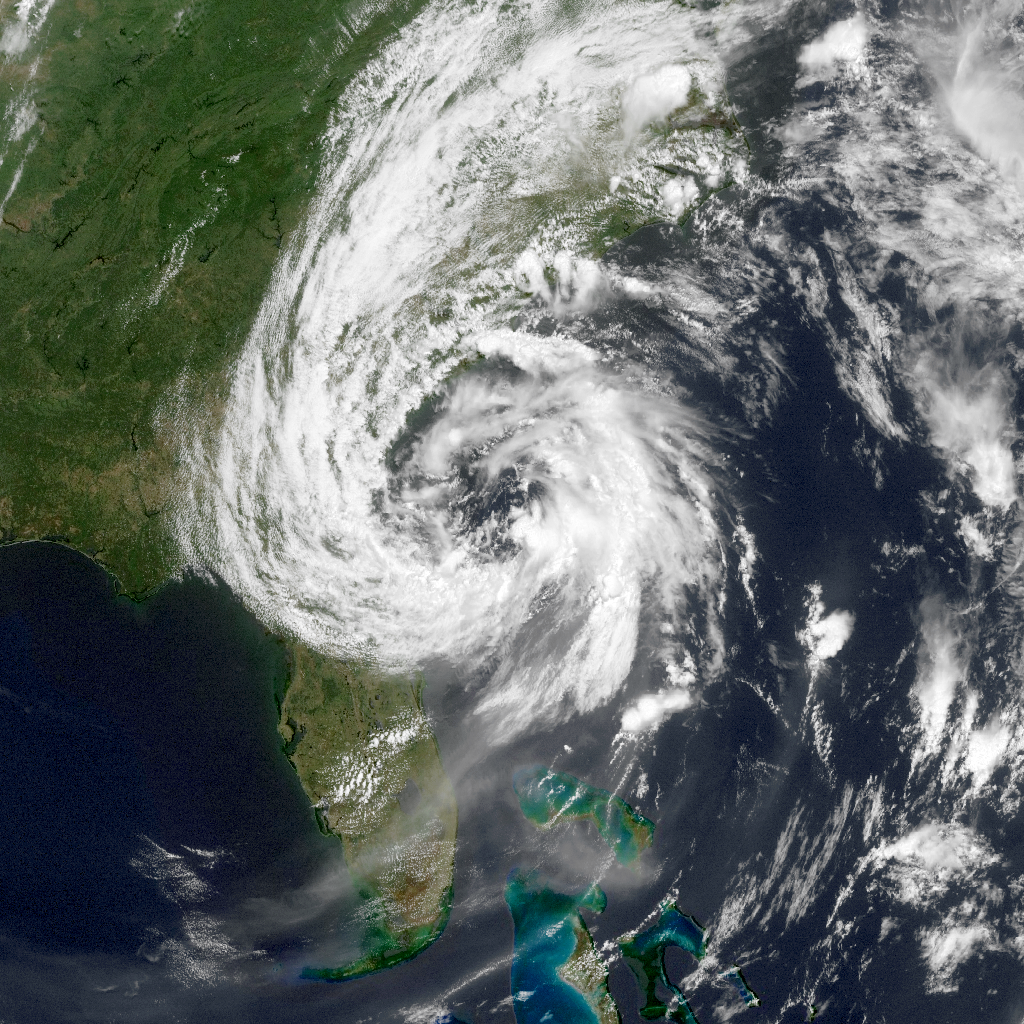
Subtropical storms, like Andrea, cannot have their intensities estimated with the Dvorak technique.

The Hebert-Poteat technique (developed by Paul J. Hebert and Kenneth O. Poteat between 1973 and 1975) is a frequently utilized system for estimating subtropical cyclone intensity derived solely from satellite imagery. An additional goal this technique set out to accomplish were to use the features of clouds correlated with various subtropical cyclones to distinguish subtropical cyclones from tropical cyclones in the emerging (sustained winds less than gale strength) stages. Furthermore, the Hebert-Poteat satellite imagery strength technique used guidelines similar to that of the Dvorak technique as an intention for a smooth transition between systems when a cyclone changes type.

== Evolution of the method ==
The development of this method first occurred in 1972 when the National Hurricane Center (NHC) took into account the short life span of subtropical cyclones and released marine statements on those systems rather than assigning extended forecasts and tropical cyclone names. This sparked a tasked conference due to the inapplicability of the Dvorak technique toward these storms in 1973. In this conference, papers were presented by Hebert and another unknown author which explained the developmental cycle and anatomy of subtropical cyclones respectively.

After the conference, numerous satellite meteorologists examined digitized structures in the months of May to November for the years 1968 to 1974 for all cloud systems north of 20 degrees latitude which gave any possible probability for a circulation center. Another meteorologist in NHC examined the surface analyses for the same period of time without any supplemental satellite imagery for all low pressure systems in the same latitudes. These data analysis sets were then combined for cyclones whose winds reached gale force before becoming a tropical storm system to develop criteria for estimating subtropical cyclone intensity.

== Classification and criteria of the method ==
Hebert-Poteat ST-Number and Corresponding Intensity
ST-Number	1-minute Sustained Wind Speeds		
ST-Number	(knots)	(mph)	(km/h)
ST 1.5	25 – 30	29 – 35	45 – 55
ST 2.5	35 – 40	40 – 46	65 – 74
ST 3.0	45 – 50	52 – 58	83 – 93
ST 3.5	55 – 65	63 – 75	102 – 120

The Hebert-Poteat technique acknowledges that most subtropical cyclones of similar intensity tend to have certain characteristic features that predictably differ in appearance as they strengthen. Since there is a mostly uniform characteristic change with intensity, the technique takes advantage and assigns an "ST-number" (an abbreviation for Subtropical Number) to the cyclone depending on its characteristics from satellite imagery without the use of surface analysis. The ST numbers correspond to observed Current Intensity (CI) values so that ST-number classifications can merge to Dvorak's T numbers when subtropical cyclones convert to tropical cyclones.

Within the Hebert-Poteat satellite imagery strength technique, there are several visual patterns associated with subtropical cyclones that supplement finding the estimated intensity with increased accuracy. A subtropical cyclone of ST 1.5 intensity must have a low-level circulation center located 1/2 to 2 degrees latitude from the edge of poorly organized (not necessarily dense) convection. For cold lows, however, convection must not connect to any other neighboring systems and an area of 3 degrees latitude or less of deep layer convection has to exist near the center. A subtropical cyclone of ST 2.5 intensity must have a low level circulation center 1/2 to 2 degrees latitude from increased deep layer convection with greater curvature than the previous day. Additionally, the outer convective band of the cyclone has to be 5 to 10 degrees of latitude east of the center with another possible convective band 2 to 4 degrees northwest of the center. A subtropical cyclone of ST 3.0 intensity must have the same characteristics as one with ST 2.5 intensity except with greater curvature and better organized convection than the previous day. The overcast of the storm may become dense. A subtropical cyclone of ST 3.5 intensity must have a deep layer convection (frequently dense overcast) in one or more bands 1 to 3 degrees latitude from the center with no central dense overcast (CDO), and an outer convective band 5 to 10 degrees latitude to the east weaker than the previous day, but a new band may form 5 to 10 degrees latitude to the west as well. For systems moving rapidly eastward, however, there may be only a dense overcast (less than 3 degrees latitude) approximately 2 to 4 degrees east of the center. Note that for ST 3.0 and ST 3.5, if the forward speed of the subtropical cyclone at the time of classification exceeds 20 knots, the excess should be added to the maximum wind speed obtained by cloud feature criteria.

For classification of a subtropical cyclone on the first day, the Hebert-Poteat technique permits an intensity rating of ST 1.5 or ST 2.5.

== Comparisons with the Dvorak technique ==
The Dvorak technique and the Hebert-Poteat technique express both similarities and differences in their methods of classifying cyclones. They exhibit similarities to each other when estimating the intensity of cyclones with the use of convective overcast and the use of the distance of the Cloud System Center (CSC) from the overcast. The Hebert-Poteat technique, however, determines the type of a cyclone while considering the environment, does not require dense overcast, and does not require bands, differing from the Dvorak technique.

== See also ==
- Pressure-wind relationship calculations for tropical cyclones
