= Satellite Analysis Branch =

United States government agency subdivision dedicated to analyzing satellite images

The United States Satellite Analysis Branch, part of National Oceanic and Atmospheric Administration (NOAA)'s National Environmental Satellite, Data, and Information Service's Satellite Services Division, is the operational focal point for real-time imagery products within NESDIS. It is also responsible for doing Dvorak technique intensity fixes on tropical cyclones. Its roots lie in the establishment of the Meteorological Satellite Section by January 1959.

Its primary mission is to "operate new proof of concept satellite analysis techniques needed to support disaster mitigation and warning services" for the U.S. government and its agencies. It also distributes real-time satellite imagery from geostationary satellites. The SAB also produces graphics for Tropical Rainfall Potential forecasts for all tropical systems in the Western Hemisphere and many in the Eastern Hemisphere.

Away from tropical cyclones, the SAB functions as the Washington Volcanic Ash Advisory Center, having been designated as such by the International Civil Aviation Organization in 1997. It also does snow and ice analysis, and has done so, along with its parent organizations NESDIS and SSD, since 1966.
