= Dvorak technique =

Subjective technique to estimate tropical cyclone intensity

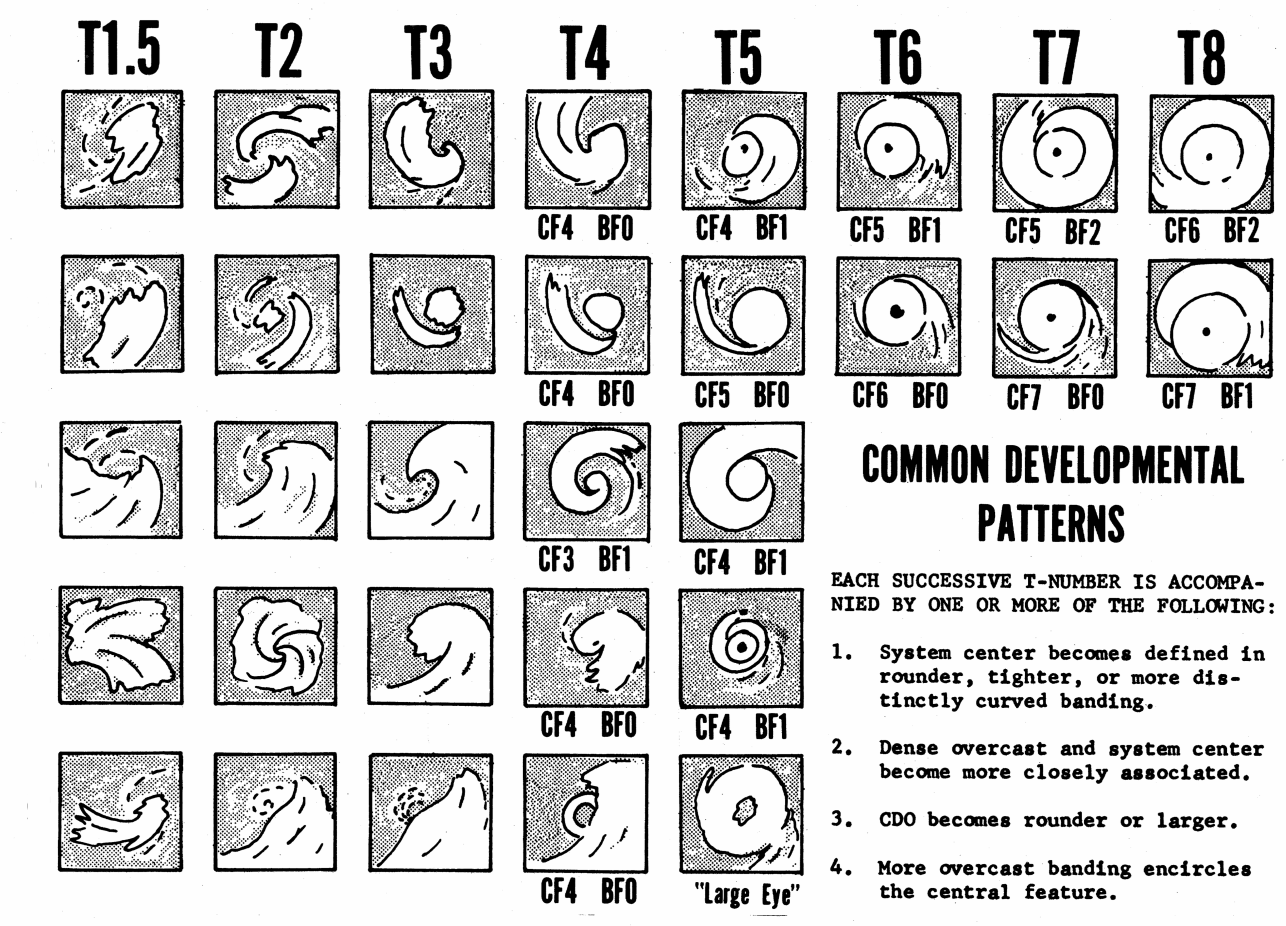
Common developmental patterns seen during tropical cyclone development, and their Dvorak-assigned intensities

The Dvorak technique (developed between 1969 and 1984 by Vernon Dvorak) is a widely used system to estimate tropical cyclone intensity (which includes tropical depression, tropical storm, and hurricane/typhoon/intense tropical cyclone intensities) based solely on visible and infrared satellite images. Within the Dvorak satellite strength estimate for tropical cyclones, there are several visual patterns that a cyclone may take on which define the upper and lower bounds on its intensity. The primary patterns used are curved band pattern (T1.0–T4.5), shear pattern (T1.5–T3.5), central dense overcast (CDO) pattern (T2.5–T5.0), central cold cover (CCC) pattern, banding eye pattern (T4.0–T4.5), and eye pattern (T4.5–T8.0).

Both the central dense overcast and embedded eye pattern use the size of the CDO. The CDO pattern intensities start at T2.5, equivalent to minimal tropical storm intensity (40 mph, 65 km/h). The shape of the central dense overcast is also considered. The eye pattern utilizes the coldness of the cloud tops within the surrounding mass of thunderstorms and contrasts it with the temperature within the eye itself. The larger the temperature difference is, the stronger the tropical cyclone. Once a pattern is identified, the storm features (such as length and curvature of banding features) are further analyzed to arrive at a particular T-number. The CCC pattern indicates little development is occurring, despite the cold cloud tops associated with the quickly evolving feature.

Several agencies issue Dvorak intensity numbers for tropical cyclones and their precursors, including the National Hurricane Center's Tropical Analysis and Forecast Branch (TAFB), the NOAA/NESDIS Satellite Analysis Branch (SAB), and the Joint Typhoon Warning Center at the Naval Meteorology and Oceanography Command in Pearl Harbor, Hawaii.

== Evolution of the method ==
The Dvorak technique does not correctly diagnose cyclone intensity for storms like Subtropical Storm Andrea since it only applies to tropical cyclones

The initial development of this technique occurred in 1969 by Vernon Dvorak, using satellite pictures of tropical cyclones within the northwest Pacific Ocean. The system as it was initially conceived involved pattern matching of cloud features with a development and decay model. As the technique matured through the 1970s and 1980s, measurement of cloud features became dominant in defining tropical cyclone intensity and central pressure of the tropical cyclone's low-pressure area. Use of infrared satellite imagery led to a more objective assessment of the strength of tropical cyclones with eyes, using the cloud top temperatures within the eyewall and contrasting them with the warm temperatures within the eye itself. Constraints on short term intensity change are used less frequently than they were back in the 1970s and 1980s. The central pressures assigned to tropical cyclones have required modification, as the original estimates were 5–10 hPa (0.15–0.29 inHg) too low in the Atlantic and up to 20 hPa (0.59 inHg) too high in the northwest Pacific. This led to the development of a separate wind-pressure relationship for the northwest Pacific, devised by Atkinson and Holliday in 1975, then modified in 1977.

As human analysts using the technique lead to subjective biases, efforts have been made to make more objective estimates using computer programs, which have been aided by higher-resolution satellite imagery and more powerful computers. Since tropical cyclone satellite patterns can fluctuate over time, automated techniques use a six-hour averaging period to lead to more reliable intensity estimates. Development of the objective Dvorak technique began in 1998, which performed best with tropical cyclones that had eyes (of hurricane or typhoon strength). It still required a manual center placement, keeping some subjectivity within the process. By 2004, an advanced objective Dvorak technique was developed which utilized banding features for systems below hurricane intensity and to objectively determine the tropical cyclone's center. A central pressure bias was uncovered in 2004 relating to the slope of the tropopause and cloud top temperatures which change with latitude that helped improve central pressure estimates within the objective technique.

== Details of the method ==
Dvorak T-Number and Corresponding Intensity
T-Number	1-min Winds			Category (SSHWS)	Min. Pressure (millibars)	
T-Number	(knots)	(mph)	(km/h)	Category (SSHWS)	Atlantic	NW Pacific
1.0 – 1.5	25	29	45	below TD	----	----
2.0	30	35	55	TD	1009	1000
2.5	35	40	65	TS	1005	998
3.0	45	52	83	TS	1000	991
3.5	55	63	102	TS–Cat 1	994	984
4.0	65	75	120	Cat 1	987	976
4.5	77	89	143	Cat 1–Cat 2	979	966
5.0	90	104	167	Cat 2–Cat 3	970	954
5.5	102	117	189	Cat 3	960	941
6.0	115	132	213	Cat 4	948	927
6.5	127	146	235	Cat 4	935	915
7.0	140	161	260	Cat 5	921	898
7.5	155	178	287	Cat 5	906	879
8.0	170	196	315	Cat 5	890	858
8.5†	185	213	343	Cat 5	873	841
Note: The pressures shown for the NW Pacific basin are lower as the pressure of the entire basin are relatively lower than that of the Atlantic basin. †Values of 8.1–8.5 are only assigned by the CIMSS and NOAA automated advanced Dvorak systems and not used in subjective analyses.

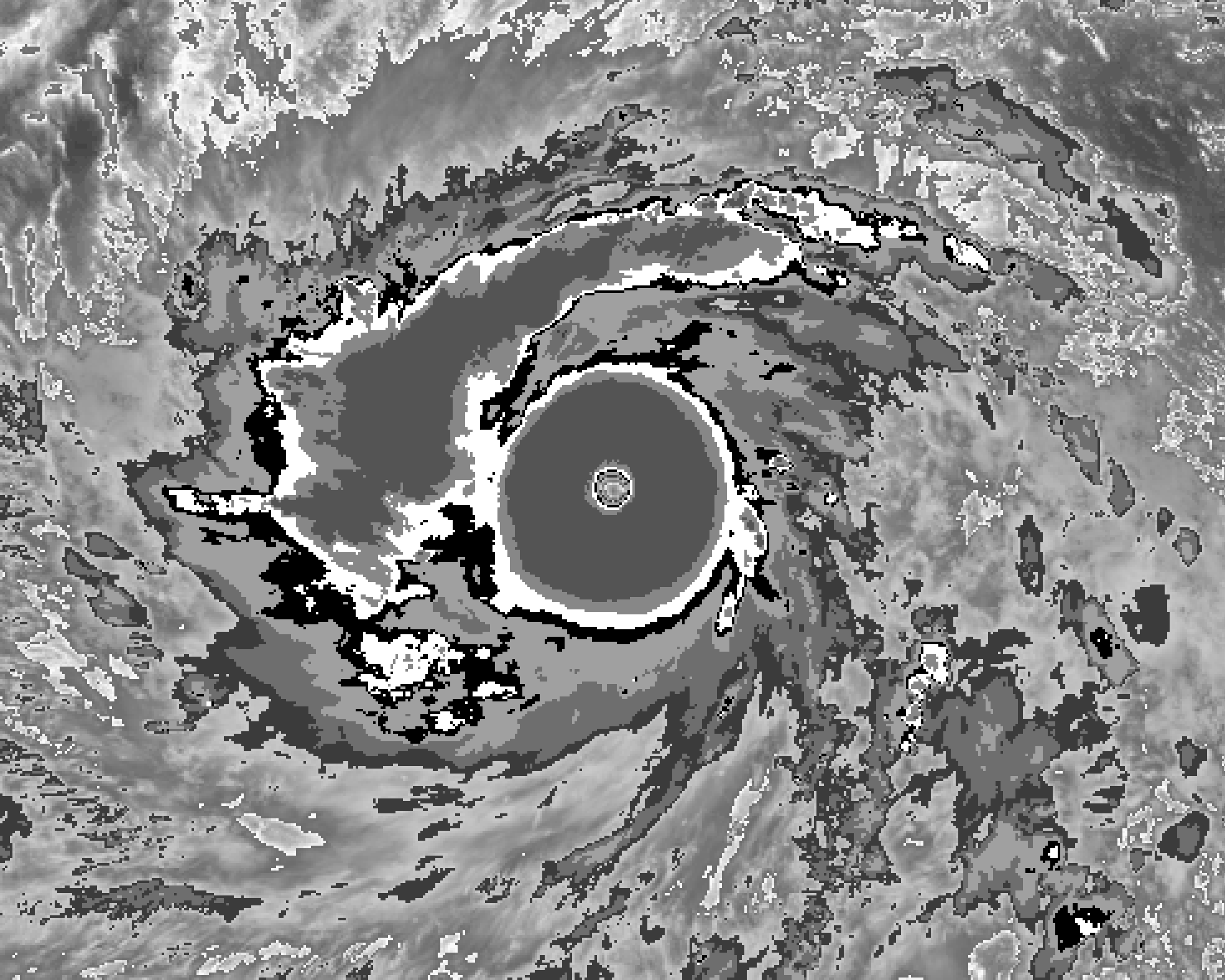
Dvorak enhancement imagery of Typhoon Haiyan at T8.0

In a developing cyclone, the technique takes advantage of the fact that cyclones of similar intensity tend to have certain characteristic features, and as they strengthen, they tend to change in appearance in a predictable manner. The structure and organization of the tropical cyclone are tracked over 24 hours to determine if the storm has weakened, maintained its intensity, or strengthened. Various central cloud and banding features are compared with templates that show typical storm patterns and their associated intensity. If infrared satellite imagery is available for a cyclone with a visible eye pattern, then the technique utilizes the difference between the temperature of the warm eye and the surrounding cold cloud tops to determine intensity (colder cloud tops generally indicate a more intense storm). In each case a "T-number" (an abbreviation for Tropical Number) and a Current Intensity (CI) value are assigned to the storm. These measurements range between 1 (minimum intensity) and 8 (maximum intensity). The T-number and CI value are the same except for weakening storms, in which case the CI is higher. For weakening systems, the CI is held as the tropical cyclone intensity for 12 hours, though research from the National Hurricane Center indicates that six hours is more reasonable. The table at right shows the approximate surface wind speed and sea level pressure that corresponds to a given T-number. The amount a tropical cyclone can change in strength per 24-hour period is limited to 2.5 T-numbers per day.

=== Pattern types ===
Within the Dvorak satellite strength estimate for tropical cyclones, there are several visual patterns that a cyclone may take on which define the upper and lower bounds on its intensity. The primary patterns used are curved band pattern (T1.0-T4.5), shear pattern (T1.5-T3.5), central dense overcast (CDO) pattern (T2.5-T5.0), banding eye pattern (T4.0-T4.5), eye pattern (T4.5 – T8.0), and central cold cover (CCC) pattern. Both the central dense overcast and embedded eye pattern utilize the size of the CDO. The CDO pattern intensities start at T2.5, equivalent to minimal tropical storm intensity (40 miles per hour (64 km/h)). The shape of the central dense overcast is also considered. The farther the center is tucked into the CDO, the stronger it is deemed. Tropical cyclones with maximum sustained winds between 65 miles per hour (105 km/h) and 100 miles per hour (160 km/h) can have their center of circulations obscured by cloudiness of the central dense overcast within visible and infrared satellite imagery, which makes diagnosis of their intensity a challenge.

The CCC pattern, with its large and quickly developing mass of thick cirrus clouds spreading out from an area of convection near a tropical cyclone center within a short time frame, indicates little development. When it develops, rainbands and cloud lines around the tropical cyclone weaken and the thick cloud shield obscures the circulation center. While it resembles a CDO pattern, it is rarely seen.

The eye pattern utilizes the coldness of the cloud tops within the surrounding mass of thunderstorms and contrasts it with the temperature within the eye itself. The larger the temperature difference is, the stronger the tropical cyclone. Winds within tropical cyclones can also be estimated by tracking features within the CDO using rapid scan geostationary satellite imagery, whose pictures are taken minutes apart rather than every half-hour.

Once a pattern is identified, the storm features (such as length and curvature of banding features) are further analyzed to arrive at a particular T-number.

== Usage ==
Several agencies issue Dvorak intensity numbers for tropical cyclones and their precursors. These include the National Hurricane Center's Tropical Analysis and Forecast Branch (TAFB), the National Oceanic and Atmospheric Administration's Satellite Analysis Branch (SAB), and the Joint Typhoon Warning Center at (JTWC) the Naval Pacific Meteorology and Oceanography Center in Pearl Harbor, Hawaii.

The National Hurricane Center will often quote Dvorak T-numbers in their tropical cyclone products. The following example is from discussion number 3 of Tropical Depression 24 (eventually Hurricane Wilma) of the 2005 Atlantic hurricane season:

BOTH TAFB AND SAB CAME IN WITH A DVORAK SATELLITE INTENSITY ESTIMATE OF T2.5/35 KT. HOWEVER ...OFTENTIMES THE SURFACE WIND FIELD OF LARGE DEVELOPING LOW PRESSURE SYSTEMS LIKE THIS ONE WILL LAG ABOUT 12 HOURS BEHIND THE SATELLITE SIGNATURE. THEREFORE... THE INITIAL INTENSITY HAS ONLY BEEN INCREASED TO 30 KT.

Note that in this case the Dvorak T-number (in this case T2.5) was simply used as a guide but other factors determined how the NHC decided to set the system's intensity.

The Cooperative Institute for Meteorological Satellite Studies (CIMSS) at the University of Wisconsin–Madison has developed the Objective Dvorak Technique (ODT). This is a modified version of the Dvorak technique which uses computer algorithms rather than subjective human interpretation to arrive at a CI number. This is generally not implemented for tropical depressions or weak tropical storms. The China Meteorological Agency (CMA) is expected to start using the standard 1984 version of Dvorak in the near future. The Indian Meteorological Department (IMD) prefers using visible satellite imagery over infrared imagery due to a perceived high bias in estimates derived from infrared imagery during the early morning hours of convective maximum. The Japan Meteorological Agency (JMA) uses the infrared version of Dvorak over the visible imagery version. Hong Kong Observatory and JMA continue to utilize Dvorak after tropical cyclone landfall. Various centers hold on to the maximum current intensity for 6–12 hours, though this rule is broken when rapid weakening is obvious.

Citizen science site Cyclone Center used a modified version of the Dvorak technique to categorize post-1970 tropical weather. The project has shut down and has since been archived.

Satellite Images of Selected Tropical Storms and hurricanes with Associated T-Number

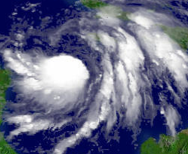
Tropical Storm Wilma at T3.0

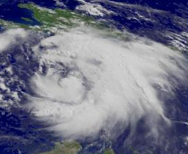
Tropical Storm Dennis at T4.0

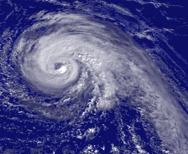
Hurricane Jeanne at T5.0

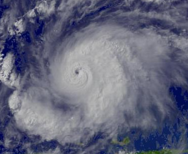
Hurricane Emily at T6.0

== Benefits and disadvantages ==
The most significant benefit of the use of the technique is that it has provided a more complete history of tropical cyclone intensity in areas where aircraft reconnaissance is neither possible nor routinely available. Intensity estimates of maximum sustained wind are currently within 5 miles per hour (8.0 km/h) of what aircraft are able to measure half of the time, though the assignment of intensity of systems with strengths between moderate tropical-storm force (60 miles per hour (97 km/h)) and weak hurricane- or typhoon-force (100 miles per hour (160 km/h)) is the least certain. Its overall precision has not always been true, as refinements in the technique led to intensity changes between 1972 and 1977 of up to 20 miles per hour (32 km/h). The method is internally consistent in that it constrains rapid increases or decreases in tropical cyclone intensity. Some tropical cyclones fluctuate in strength more than the 2.5 T numbers per day limit allowed by the rule, which can work to the technique's disadvantage and has led to occasional abandonment of the constraints since the 1980s. Systems with small eyes near the limb, or edge, of a satellite image can be biased too weakly using the technique, which can be resolved through use of polar-orbiting satellite imagery. Subtropical cyclone intensity cannot be determined using Dvorak, which led to the development of the Hebert-Poteat technique in 1975. Cyclones undergoing extratropical transition, losing their thunderstorm activity, see their intensities underestimated using the Dvorak technique. This led to the development of the Miller and Lander extratropical transition technique which can be used under these circumstances.

== See also ==
Other tools used to determine tropical cyclone intensity:

- Quikscat
- TRMM
