= List of South Atlantic tropical and subtropical cyclones =

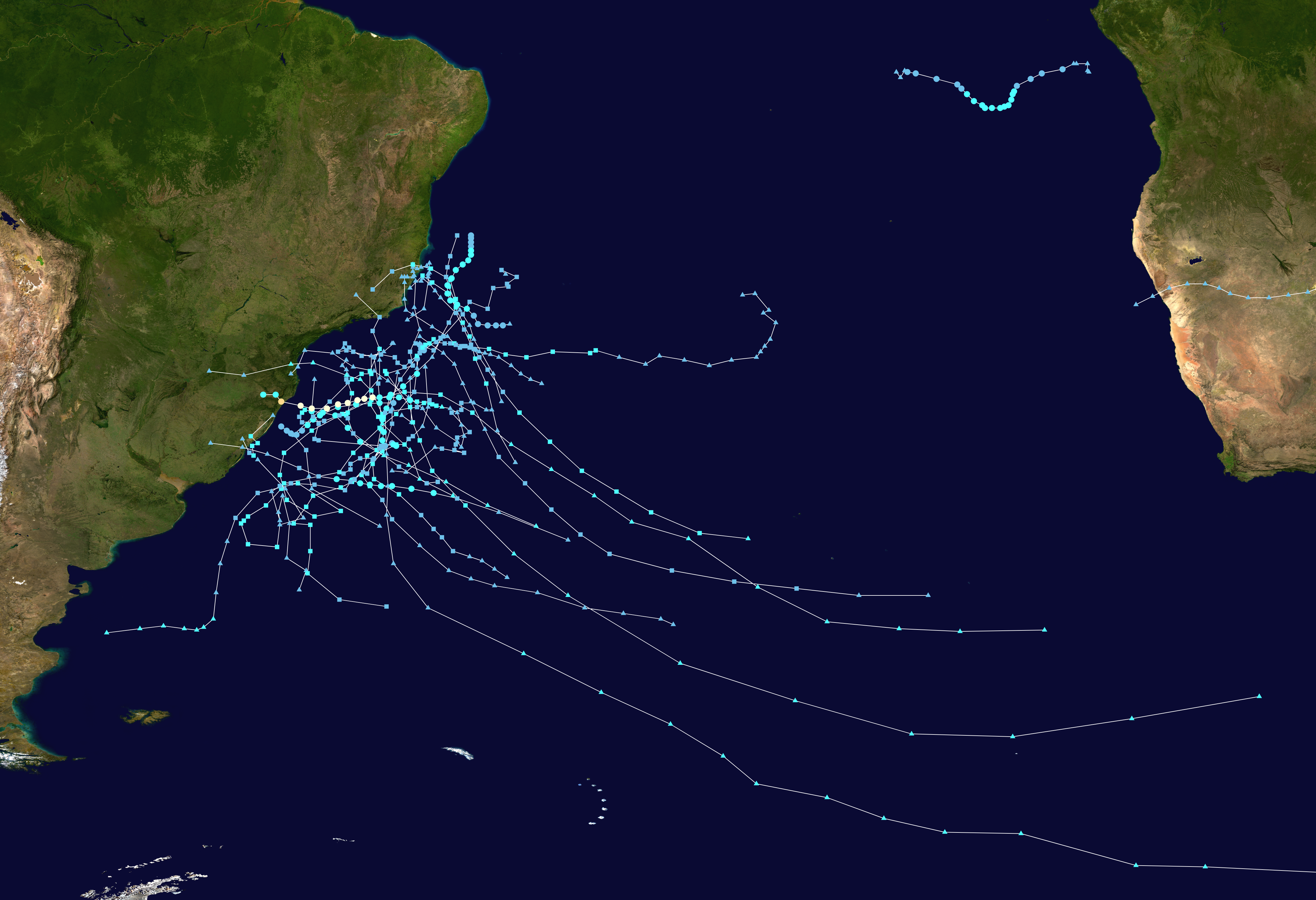
Summary map of most recognized South Atlantic tropical and subtropical cyclones from 1991–2026

This article documents all South Atlantic tropical cyclones that have been recorded. Tropical cyclone formation is rare in the South Atlantic due to multiple limiting factors, such as relatively low sea surface temperatures, strong wind shear typically being present across the basin, and a lack of disturbances from the intertropical convergence zone that could form into tropical cyclones. Due to this sheer rarity, South Atlantic tropical cyclones weren’t recorded until the 1970s, as weather and satellite technology at the time weren't advanced enough to detect the majority of these systems. Since 2011, South Atlantic tropical cyclones have been assigned names from a list of names provided by the Brazilian Navy.

== Summary ==
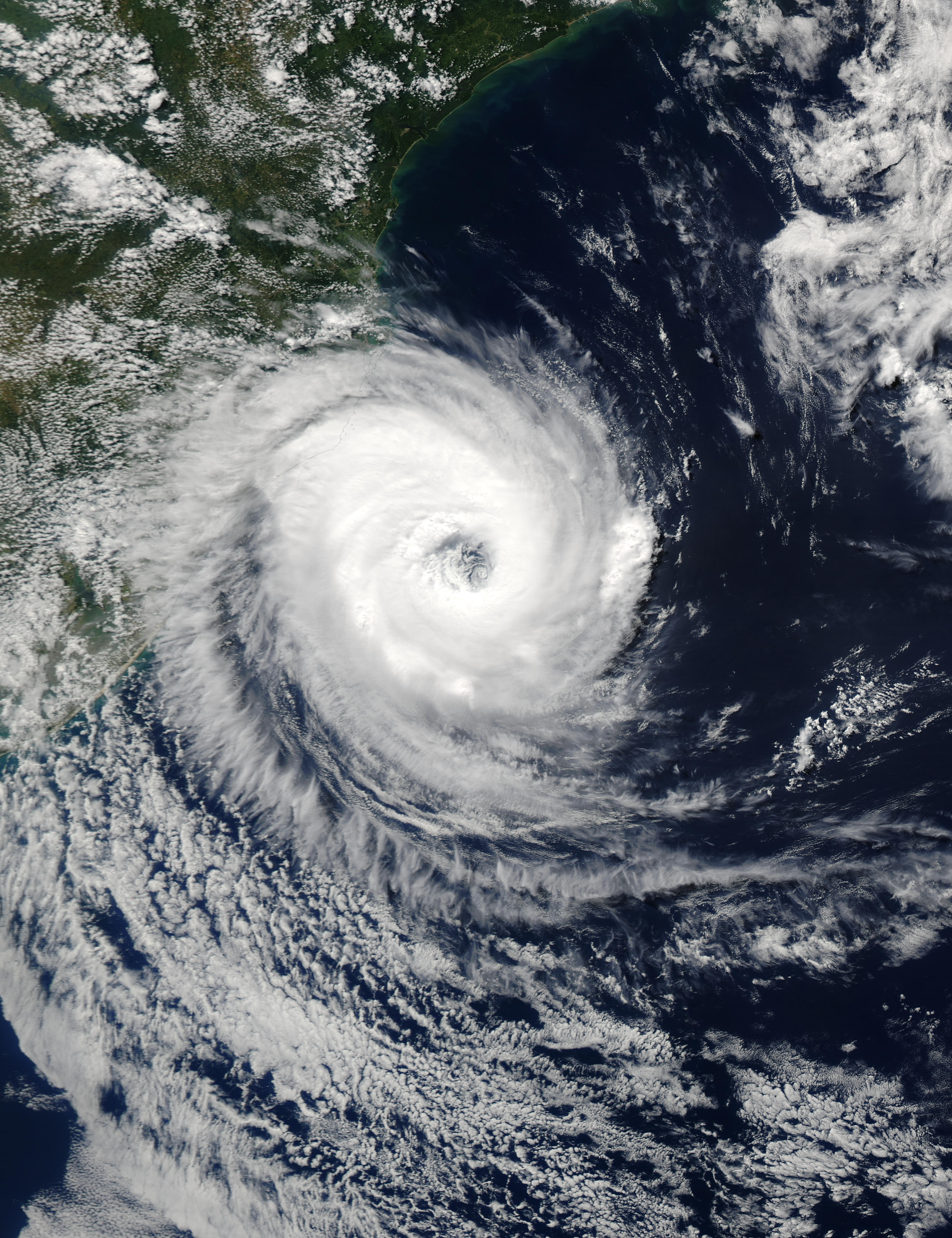
Satellite imagery of Cyclone Catarina, the only officially recorded hurricane in the South Atlantic Ocean

It was initially thought that tropical cyclones did not develop within the South Atlantic. Very strong vertical wind shear in the troposphere is considered a deterrent. The Intertropical Convergence Zone drops one to two degrees south of the equator, not far enough from the equator for the Coriolis force to significantly aid development. Water temperatures in the tropics of the southern Atlantic are cooler than those in the tropical north Atlantic.

Although they are rare, during April 1991 the United States' National Hurricane Center (NHC) reported that a tropical cyclone had developed over the Eastern South Atlantic. In subsequent years, a few systems were suspected to have the characteristics needed to be classified as a tropical cyclone, including in March 1994 and January 2004. During March 2004, an extratropical cyclone formally transitioned into a tropical cyclone and made landfall on Brazil, after becoming a Category 2 hurricane on the Saffir–Simpson hurricane wind scale. While the system was threatening the Brazilian state of Santa Catarina, a newspaper used the headline "Furacão Catarina", which was originally presumed to mean "furacão (hurricane) threatening (Santa) Catarina (the state)". After international presses started monitoring the system, "Hurricane Catarina" has formally been adopted.

== Pre–2000 ==
According to a presentation at the Sixth WMO International Workshop on Tropical Cyclones (IWTC-VI), satellite imagery from January 1970 showed that a system with an eyewall had developed behind a cold front and that the system needed further analysis to determine if it was tropical or subtropical.

On 27 March 1974, a weak area of low pressure that had originated over the Amazon River started to intensify further. Over the next 48 hours the system quickly developed further and was classified as subtropical, as it developed a banding structure and deep convection near its warm core. On 29 March, a north-westerly flow encroached on the systems environment, which caused the system to rapidly move towards 40S and the cold waters that were present to the south of 40°S.

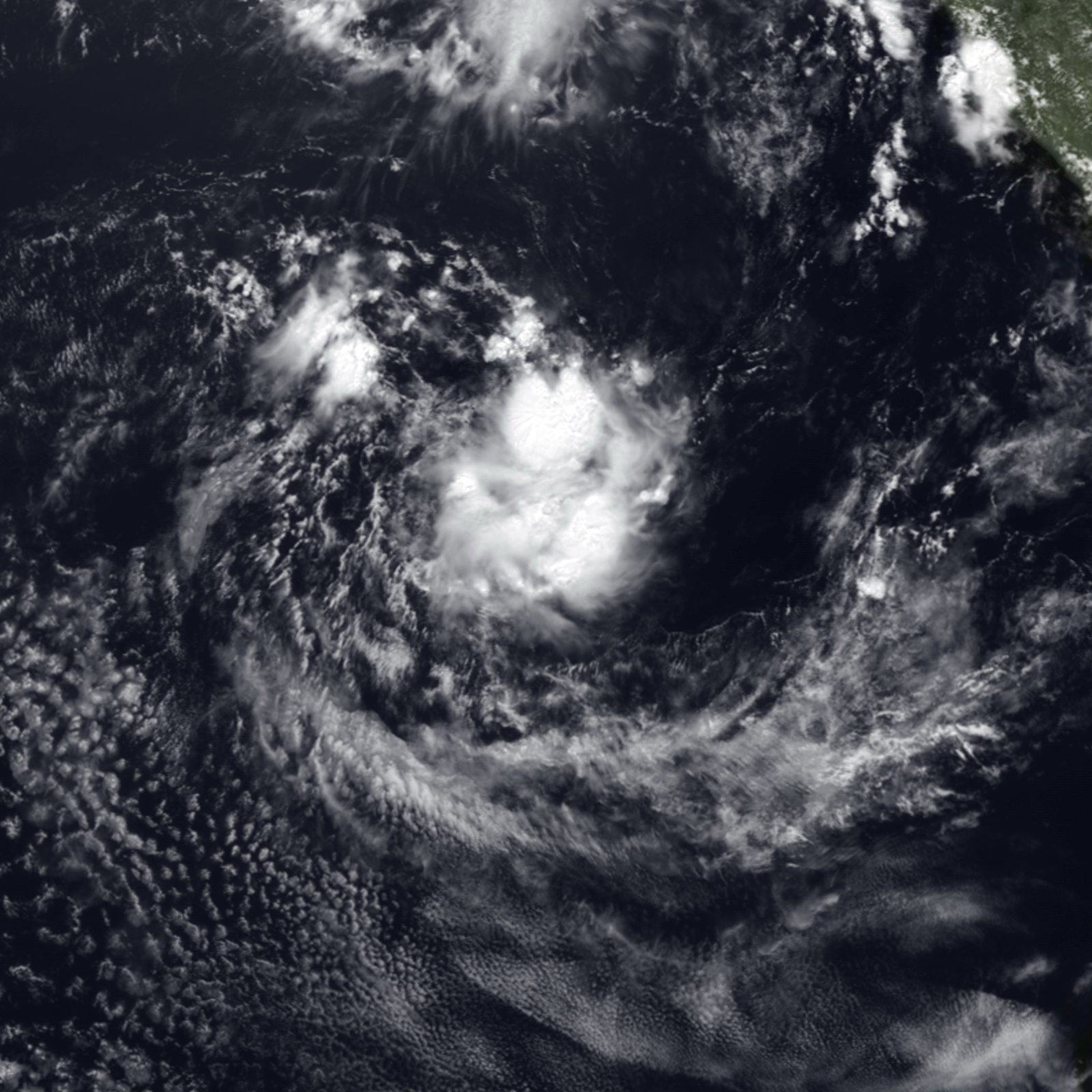
Satellite image of a possible tropical storm off the coast of Angola in 1991

On April 10, 1991, a low-pressure system formed off the coast of Angola, which developed into a tropical depression on the 11th. By the morning of April 12, the cyclone had intensified into a tropical storm, reaching its peak intensity on the 13th. On the 15th, it weakened to a tropical depression, which eventually weakened to a remnant low and dissipated on the 16th. This tropical storm moved generally from east to west in a U-shaped trajectory and is the only tropical cyclone recorded in the satellite era in the southeastern Atlantic.

In March 1994, a system was spawned but was located over cool and open waters.

According to the Zambia Meteorological Department, Cyclone Bonita moved off the coast of Angola and entered the South Atlantic Ocean on 19 January 1996. By the next day, the system had succumbed to cold waters and days of land interaction, dissipating completely. It was the first tropical cyclone known to have traversed southern Africa from the South-West Indian Ocean to the South Atlantic.

== 2000s ==
During 2004, the large-scale conditions over the South Atlantic were more conducive than usual for subtropical or tropical systems, with 4 systems noted. The first possible tropical cyclone developed within a trough of low pressure, to the southeast of Salvador, Brazil on 18 January. The system subsequently displayed a small central dense overcast (CDO) and was suspected to have peaked in intensity as a tropical depression the next day. There was some consensus amongst researchers that this system may have acquired tropical storm-force winds, yet this still remains unclear. The system was subsequently affected by some strong shear, before it moved inland and weakened along the coast of Brazil before it was last noted during 21 January. Within Brazil the system caused heavy rain and flooding with a state of emergency declared in Aracaju, after the river overflowed and burst its banks which flooded homes, destroyed crops and caused parts of the highway to collapse. However, it was noted that not all of the heavy rain and impacts were attributable to the system, as a large monsoon low covered much of Brazil at the time. The system was unofficially dubbed "Samba" by researchers communicating about the system, named after a popular genre of Brazilian music. The second system was a possible hybrid cyclone that developed near south-eastern Brazil between 15 and 16 March. Hurricane Catarina was the third system, while the fourth system formed off the coast of Brazil on 15 May 2004.

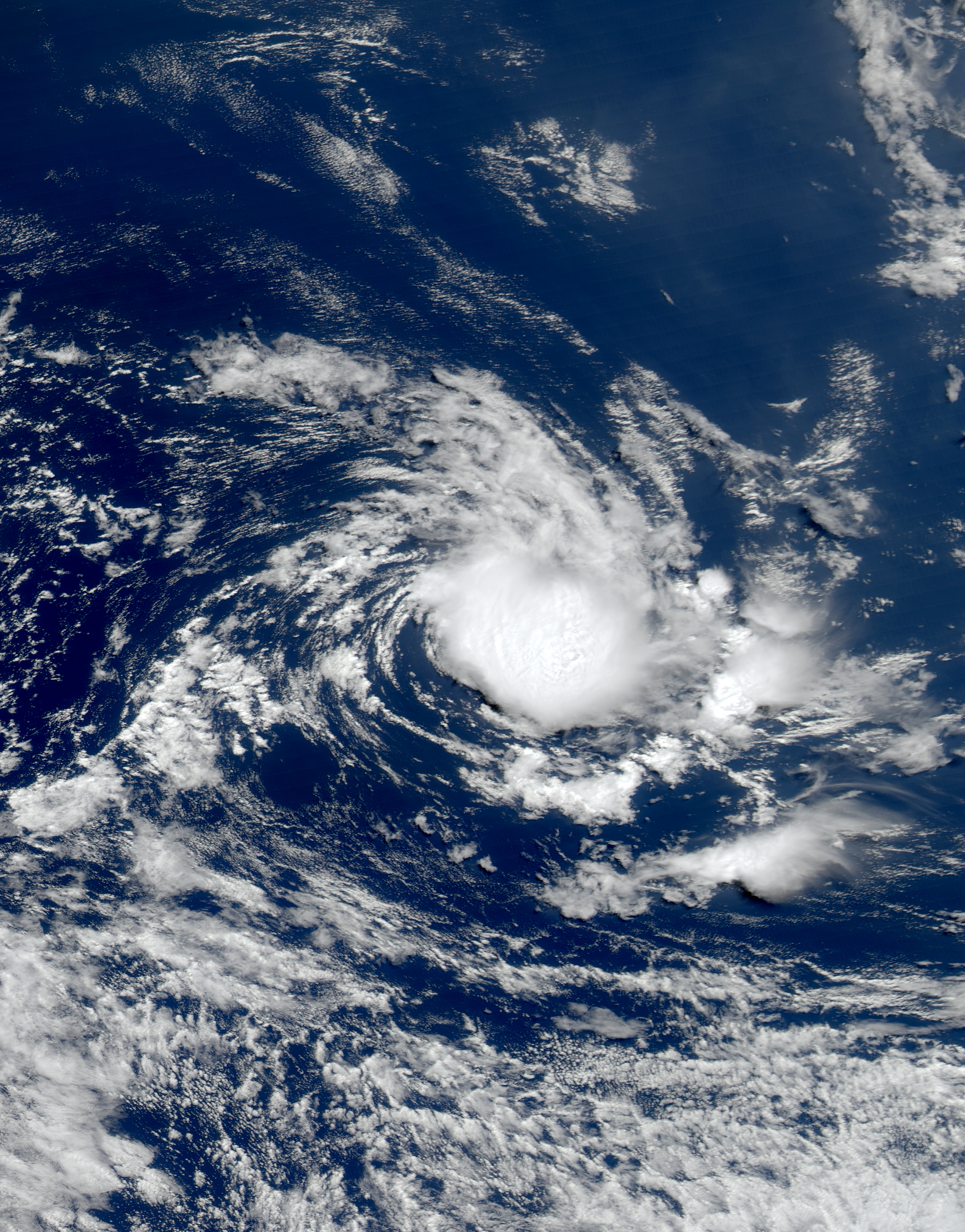
MODIS visible satellite image of a possible February 2006 tropical storm

Cyclone Catarina was an extraordinarily rare hurricane-strength tropical cyclone, forming in the southern Atlantic Ocean in March 2004. Soon after becoming a hurricane, it hit the southern coast of Brazil in the state of Santa Catarina on the evening of 28 March, with winds up to 100 miles per hour (160 km/h) making it a Category 2-equivalent cyclone on the Saffir–Simpson hurricane scale. Catarina killed 3 to 11 people and caused millions of dollars in damage in Brazil. At the time, Brazilians were taken completely by surprise, and were initially skeptical that an actual tropical cyclone could have formed in the South Atlantic. Eventually, however, they were convinced, and adopted the previously unofficial name "Catarina" for the storm, after Santa Catarina state. This event is considered by some meteorologists to be a nearly once-in-a-lifetime occurrence.

On 22 February 2006, a baroclinic cyclone intensified quickly and was estimated to have peaked with 1-minute sustained wind speeds of 105 km/h (65 mph), after radar data showed that the system had developed an eye and banding. However, there were questions about how tropical the system was, as it did not separate from the westerlies or the baroclinic zone it was in. Between 11 and 17 March 2006, another system with a warm core developed and moved southward along the South Atlantic Zone, before dissipating.

On 28 January 2009, "a cold-core mid to upper-level trough was in phase with a low-level warm-core low", which formed a system and moved eastward into the South Atlantic. According to Alexandre Aguiar from MetSul Weather Center in Porto Alegre, Southern Brazil, "The storm produced rainfall in 24 hours of 300 mm (12 in) or more in some locations of Rocha (Uruguay) and southern Rio Grande do Sul." The weather station owned by MetSul in Morro Redondo, Brazil, recorded 278.2 mm (10.95 in) in a 24-hour period. The storm caused fourteen deaths and the evacuation of thousands, with an emergency declared in four cities. It lasted until 1 February, when the cyclone became extratropical.

== 2010s ==
=== Tropical Storm Anita ===
- Tropical storm (SSHWS)
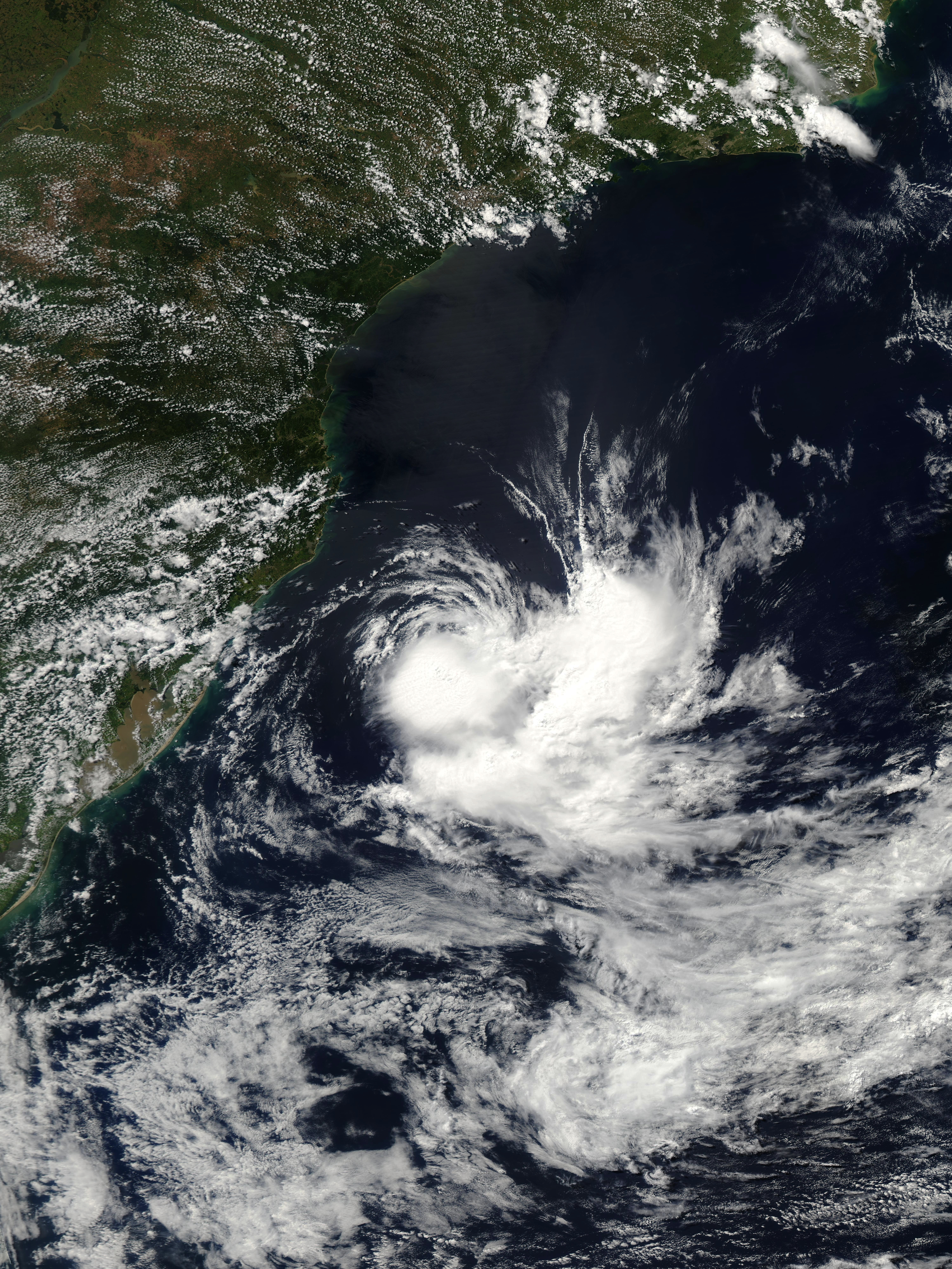
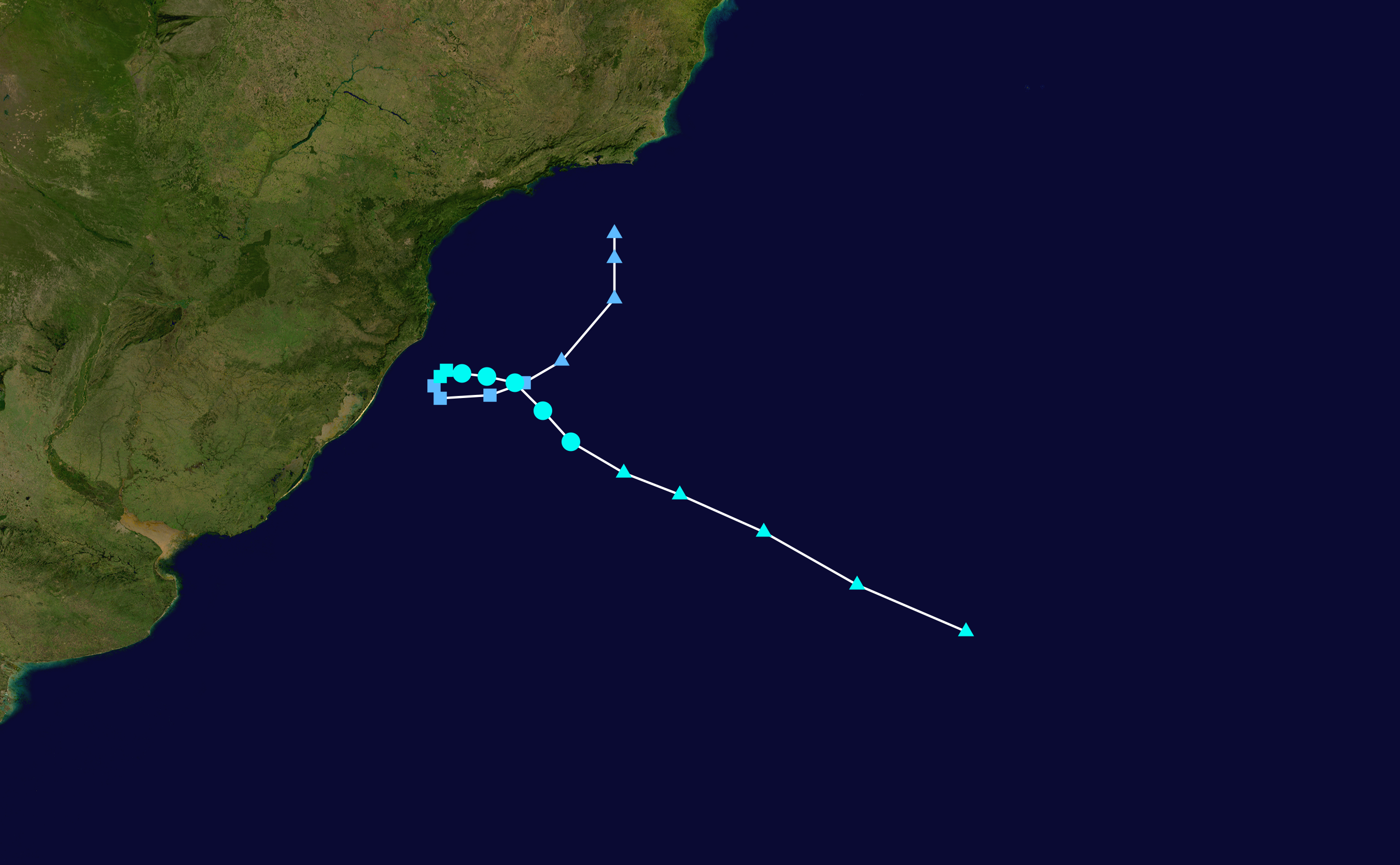
- Duration: 8 March 2010 – 12 March 2010
- Peak intensity: 85 km/h (50 mph) (1-min); 995 hPa (mbar)

On 8 March 2010, a previously extratropical cyclone developed tropical characteristics and was classified as a subtropical cyclone off the coast of southern Brazil. The following day, the United States Naval Research Laboratory began monitoring the system as a system of interest under the designation of 90Q. The National Hurricane Center also began monitoring the system as Low SL90. During the afternoon of 9 March, the system had attained an intensity of 55 km/h (34 mph) and a barometric pressure of 1000 hPa (mbar). It was declared a tropical storm on 10 March and became extratropical late on 12 March. Anita's accumulated cyclone energy was estimated at 2.0525 by the Florida State University. There was no damage associated to the storm, except high sea in the coasts of Rio Grande do Sul and Santa Catarina. Post mortem, the cyclone was given the name "Anita" by private and public weather centers in Southern Brazil.

=== Subtropical Storm Arani ===
- Subtropical storm (SSHWS)
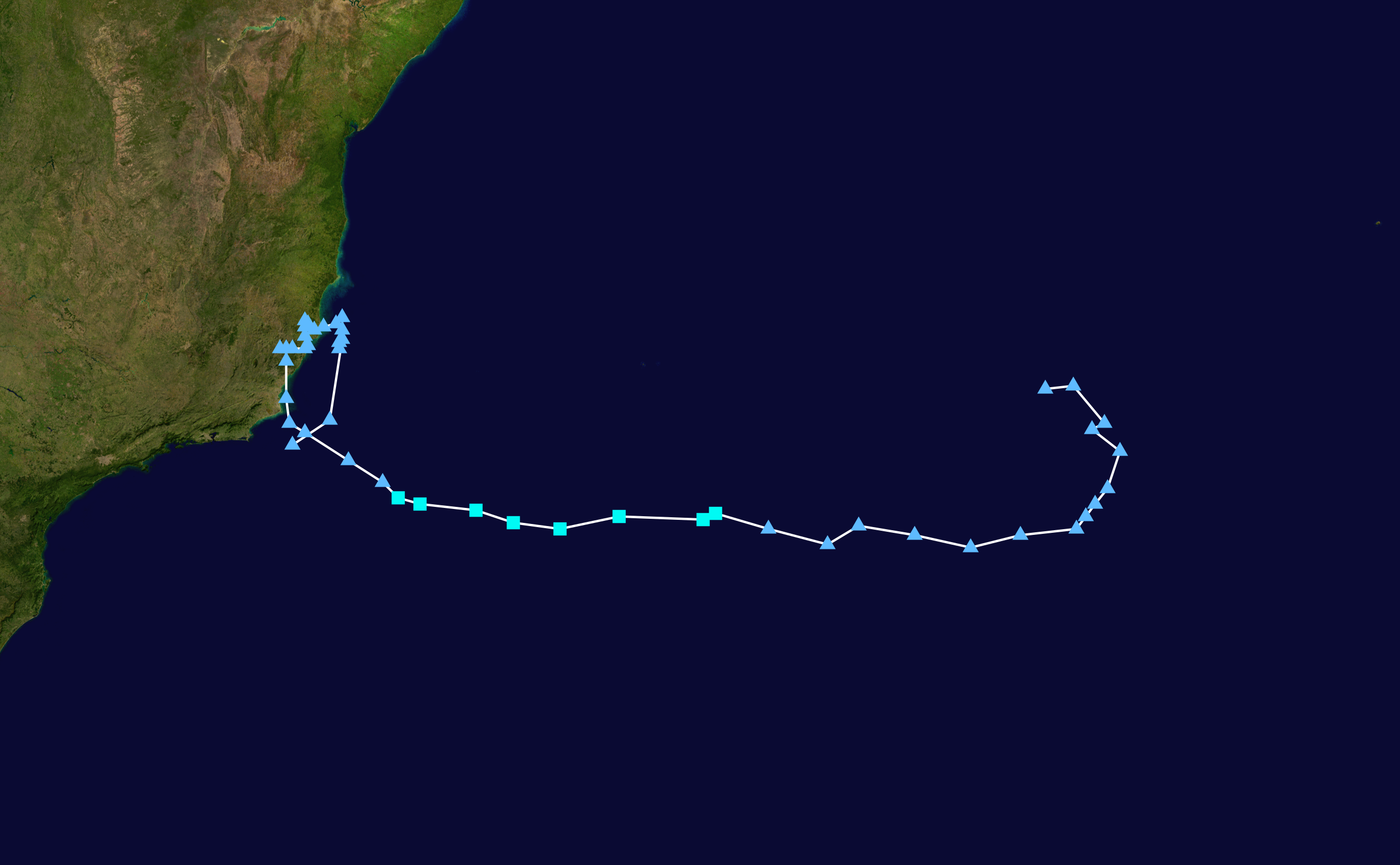
- Duration: 14 March 2011 – 16 March 2011
- Peak intensity: 85 km/h (50 mph) (1-min); 998 hPa (mbar)

Early on 14 March 2011, the Navy Hydrographic Center-Brazilian Navy (SMM), in coordination with the National Institute of Meteorology, were monitoring an organizing area of convection near the southeast coast of Brazil. Later that day a low-pressure area developed just east of Vitória, Espírito Santo, and by 12:00 UTC, the system organized into a subtropical depression, located about 140 km (87 mi) east of Campos dos Goytacazes. Guided by a trough and a weak ridge to its north, the system moved slowly southeastward over an area of warm waters, intensifying into Subtropical Cyclone Arani on 15 March, as named by the Brazilian Navy Hydrographic Center, and achieving its lowest pressure. The storm was classified as subtropical, as the convection was east of the center. On 16 March, Arani began experiencing 25 kn (13 m/s; 46 km/h; 29 mph) of wind shear because another frontal system bumped it from behind. As it moved east-southeastwards, it achieved its highest winds as it transitioned back to an extratropical cyclone, process that was concluded on early 17 March.

Before it developed into a subtropical cyclone, Arani produced torrential rains over portions of southeastern Brazil, resulting in flash flooding and landslides. Significant damage was reported in portions of Espírito Santo, though specifics are unknown. Increased swells along the coast prompted ocean travel warnings.

=== Subtropical Depression #01-2015 ===
- Subtropical depression (SSHWS)
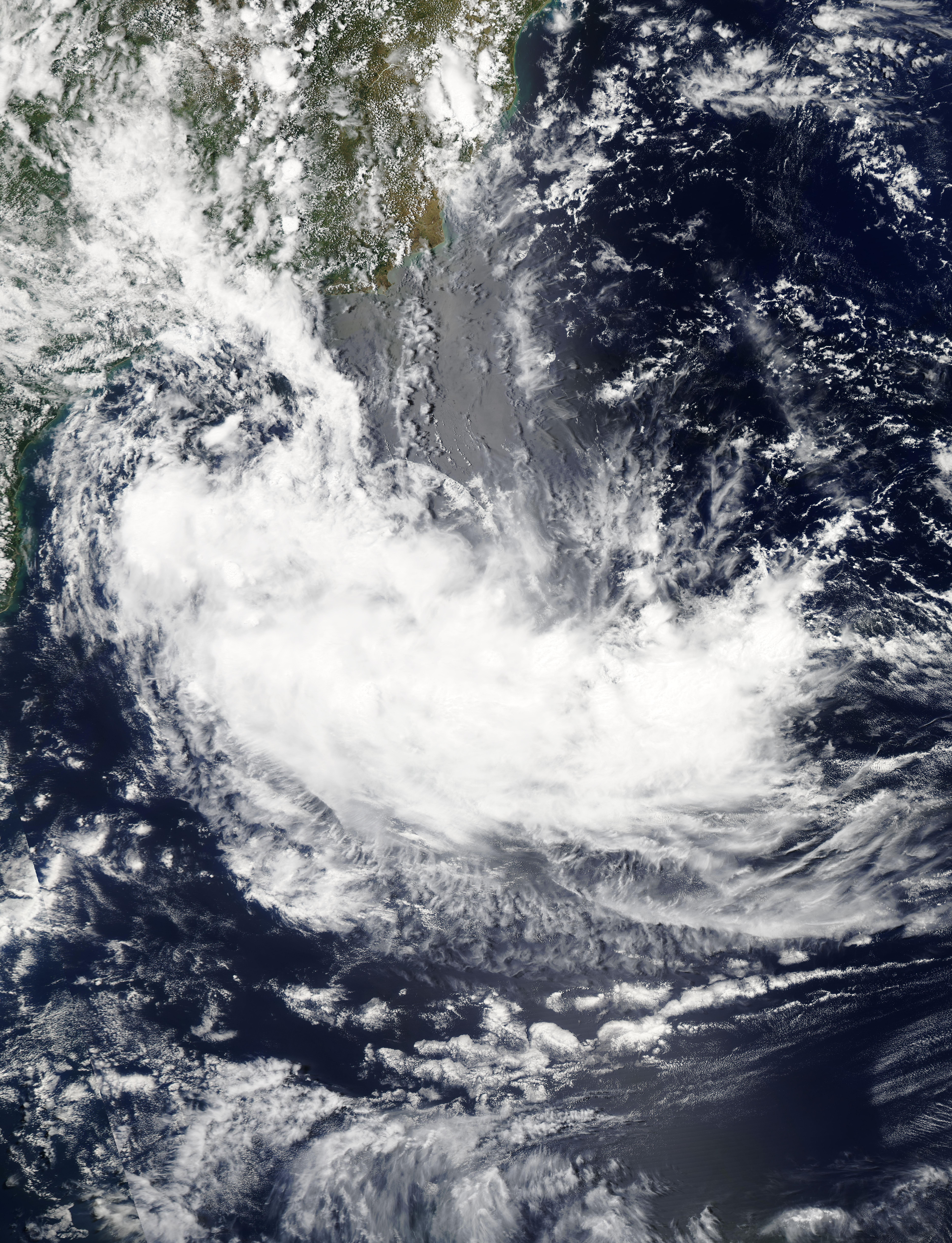
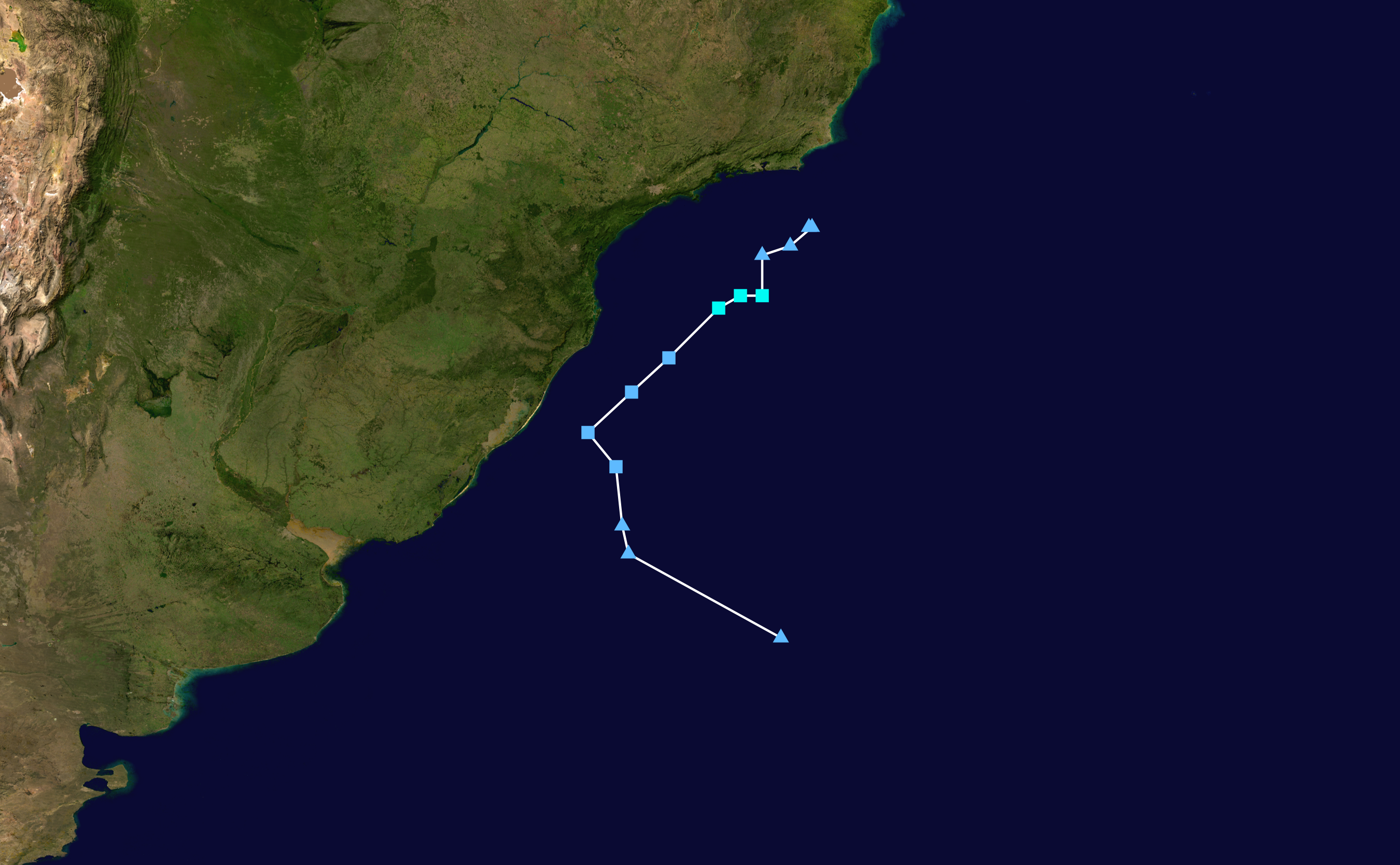
- Duration: 23 January 2015 – 24 January 2015
- Peak intensity: 55 km/h (35 mph) (1-min); 1008 hPa (mbar)

On late 22 January 2015, instability areas formed well south of the state of Rio de Janeiro, associated with a trough attached with a low-pressure area active on the region. Early on the next day, over a region with anomalous warm sea surface temperatures, convection organized over a low-level center of circulation, which achieved its peak intensity of 70 km/h (43 mph). Shortly after the system was declared a subtropical depression, about 200 nautical miles (370 km; 230 mi) to the southeast of São Paulo, Brazil.

For the rest of the day, the storm moved south and then turned southwestward, until it lost its subtropical characteristics over high seas on the next day, becoming a remnant low about 427 nautical miles (790 km; 490 mi) to the east of Rio Grande do Sul, Brazil.

The Brazilian Navy noted in its post-season analysis that on early and mid 23 January the radiometer built into the AMSR-2 satellite found winds of 35 to 40 knots, which could led to the system been upgraded into a subtropical storm, but it didn't happen because no other measurement confirmed such findings.

=== Subtropical Storm Bapo ===
- Subtropical storm (SSHWS)
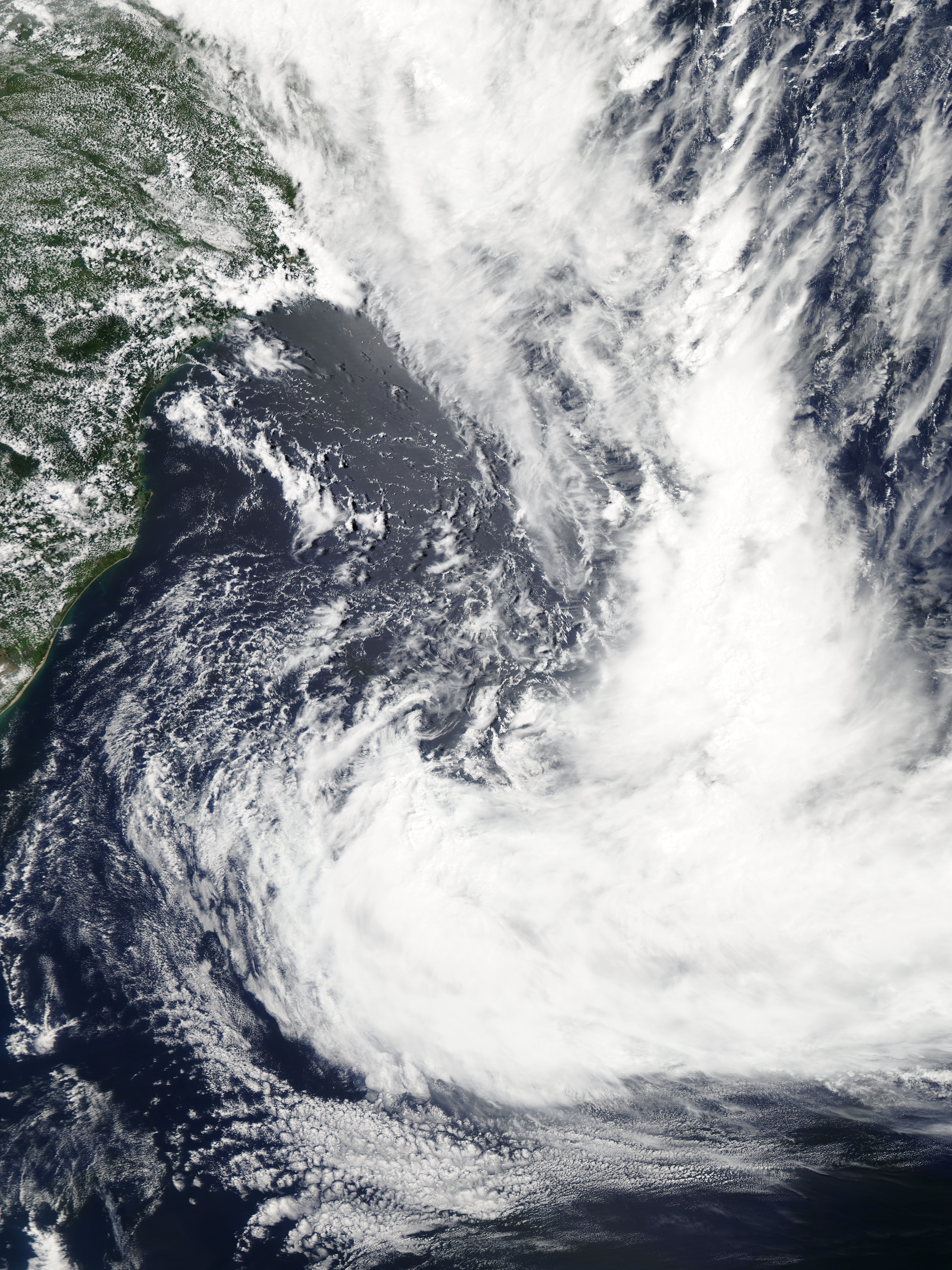
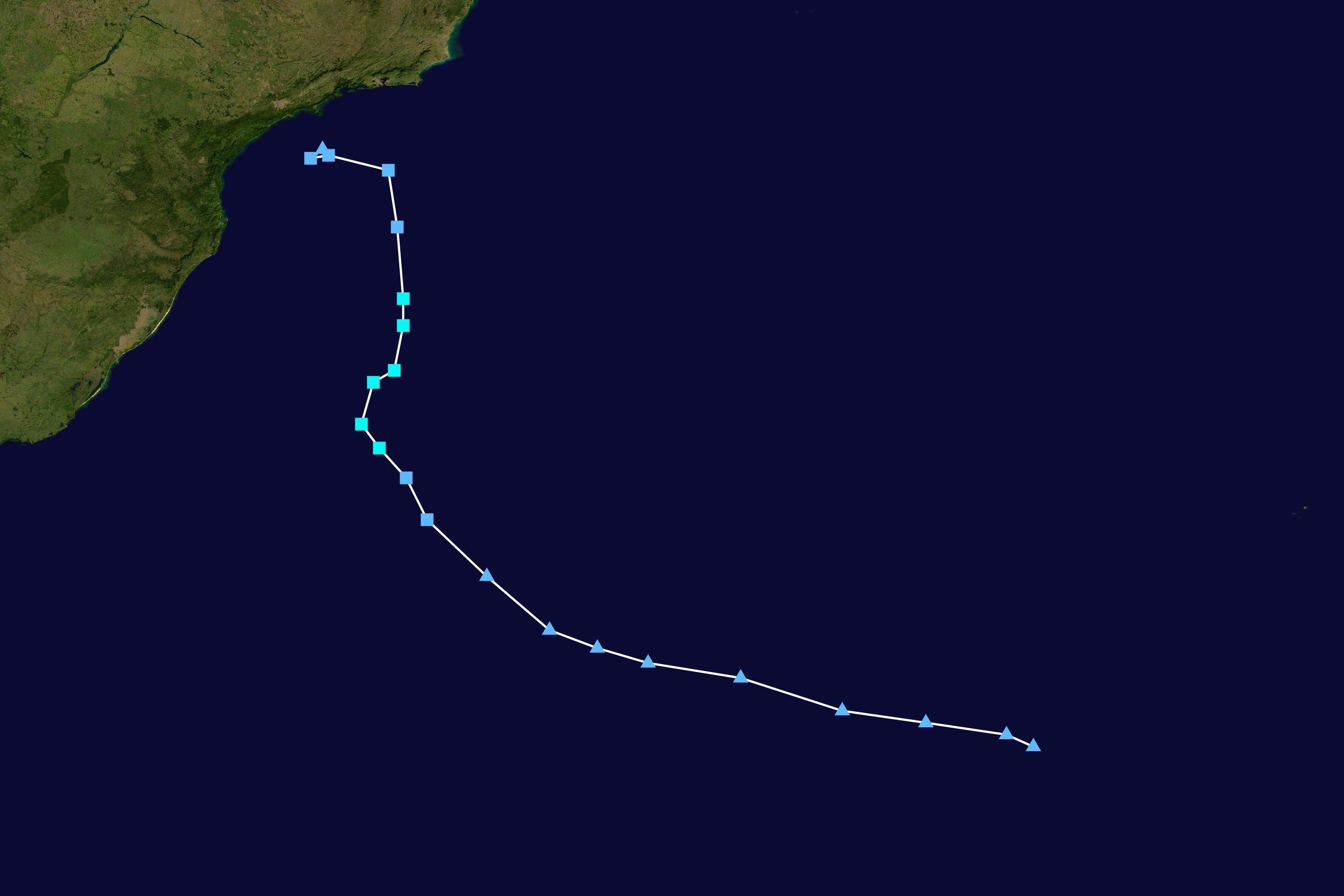
- Duration: 5 February 2015 – 7 February 2015
- Peak intensity: 65 km/h (40 mph) (1-min); 992 hPa (mbar)

On 5 February 2015, a subtropical depression developed about 105 nautical miles (195 km; 120 mi) to the southeast of São Paulo, Brazil. During the next day, low-level baroclinity decreased around the system, as it moved southeastwards away from the Brazilian coast and into anomalously warm waters, where it intensified further. The system was named Bapo by the Brazilian Navy Hydrography Center during 6 February as it had intensified into a subtropical storm. Over the next couple of days the system continued to move south-eastwards, achieving its peak intensity just before it transitioned into an extratropical cyclone during 8 February.

=== Subtropical Storm Cari ===
- Subtropical storm (SSHWS)
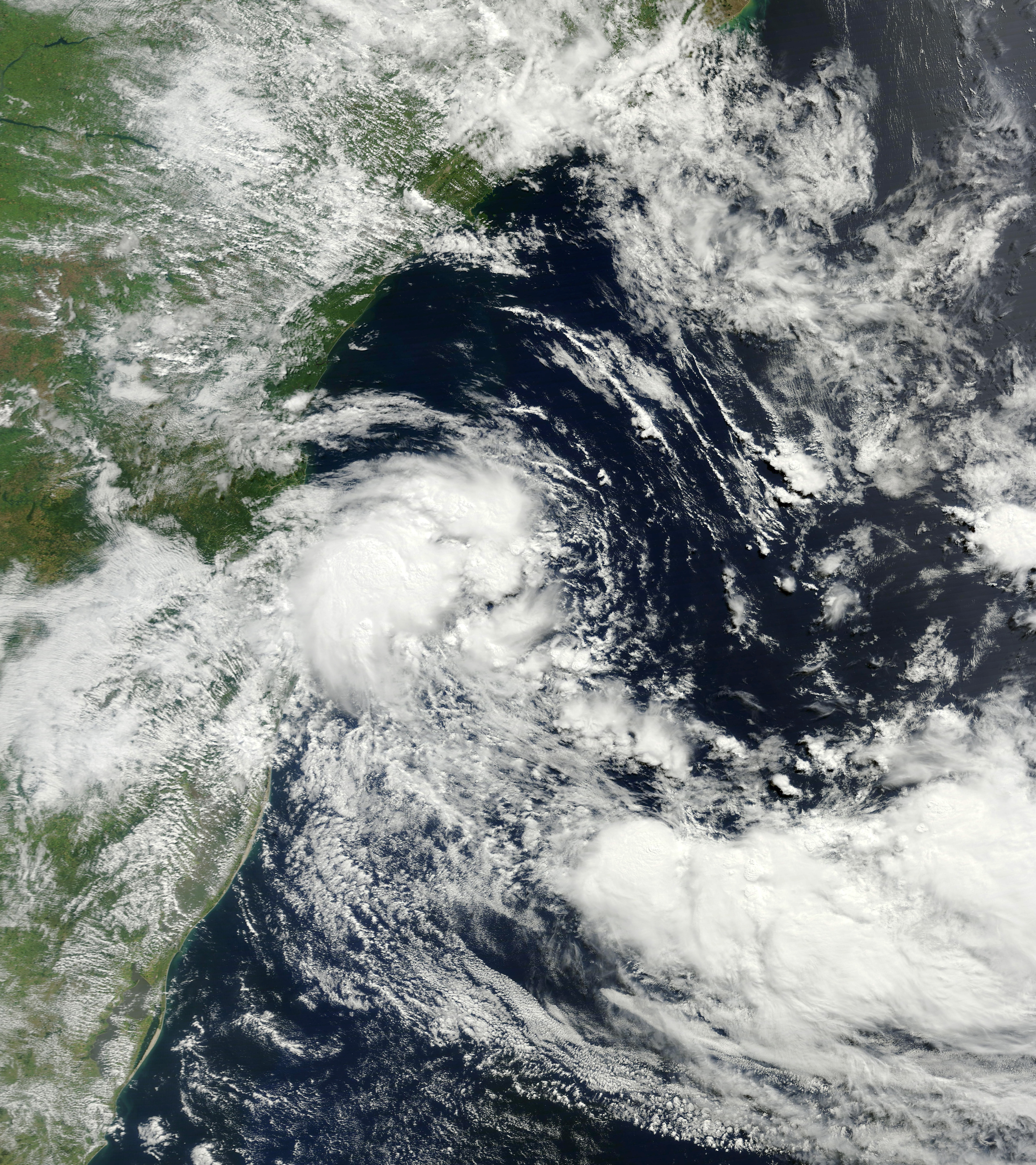
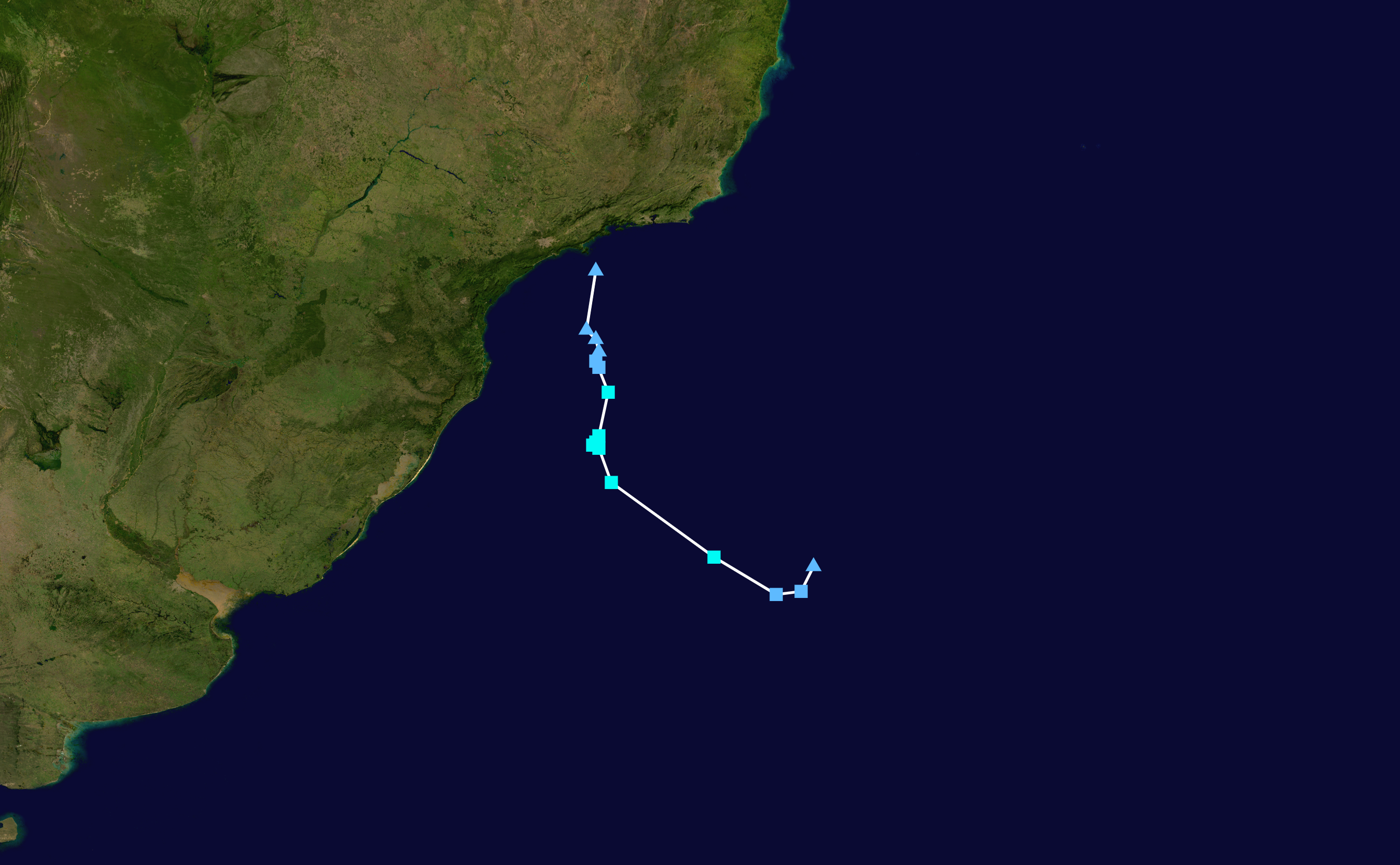
- Duration: 10 March 2015 – 13 March 2015
- Peak intensity: 65 km/h (40 mph) (1-min); 998 hPa (mbar)

On 10 March 2015, the Hydrographic Center of the Brazilian Navy began issuing warnings on Subtropical Depression 3 during early afternoon, while the Center for Weather Forecast and Climatic Studies (CPTEC in Portuguese) already assigned the name Cari for the storm. At 00:00 UTC on 11 March, the Hydrographic Center of the Brazilian Navy upgraded Cari to a subtropical storm, also assigning this name to it. On 12 March, the Brazilian Hydrographic Center downgraded Cari to a subtropical depression as it achieved its lowest pressure, while the CPTEC stated that the storm had become a "Hybrid cyclone" as it moved away from the continental coastline. During early afternoon of 13 March, the Brazilian Navy declared that Cari became a remnant low.

Cari brought heavy rainfall, flooding and landslides to eastern cities of Santa Catarina and Rio Grande do Sul states as it interacted with a South Atlantic Convergence Zone. Rain totals from 100 to 180 mm (3.9 to 7.1 in) were observed associated with the storms and wind topped 75 km/h (47 mph) in Cabo de Santa Marta. A Navy buoy registered a 6-metre (20 ft) wave off the coast of Santa Catarina.

=== Subtropical Depression #01-2016 ===
- Subtropical depression (SSHWS)
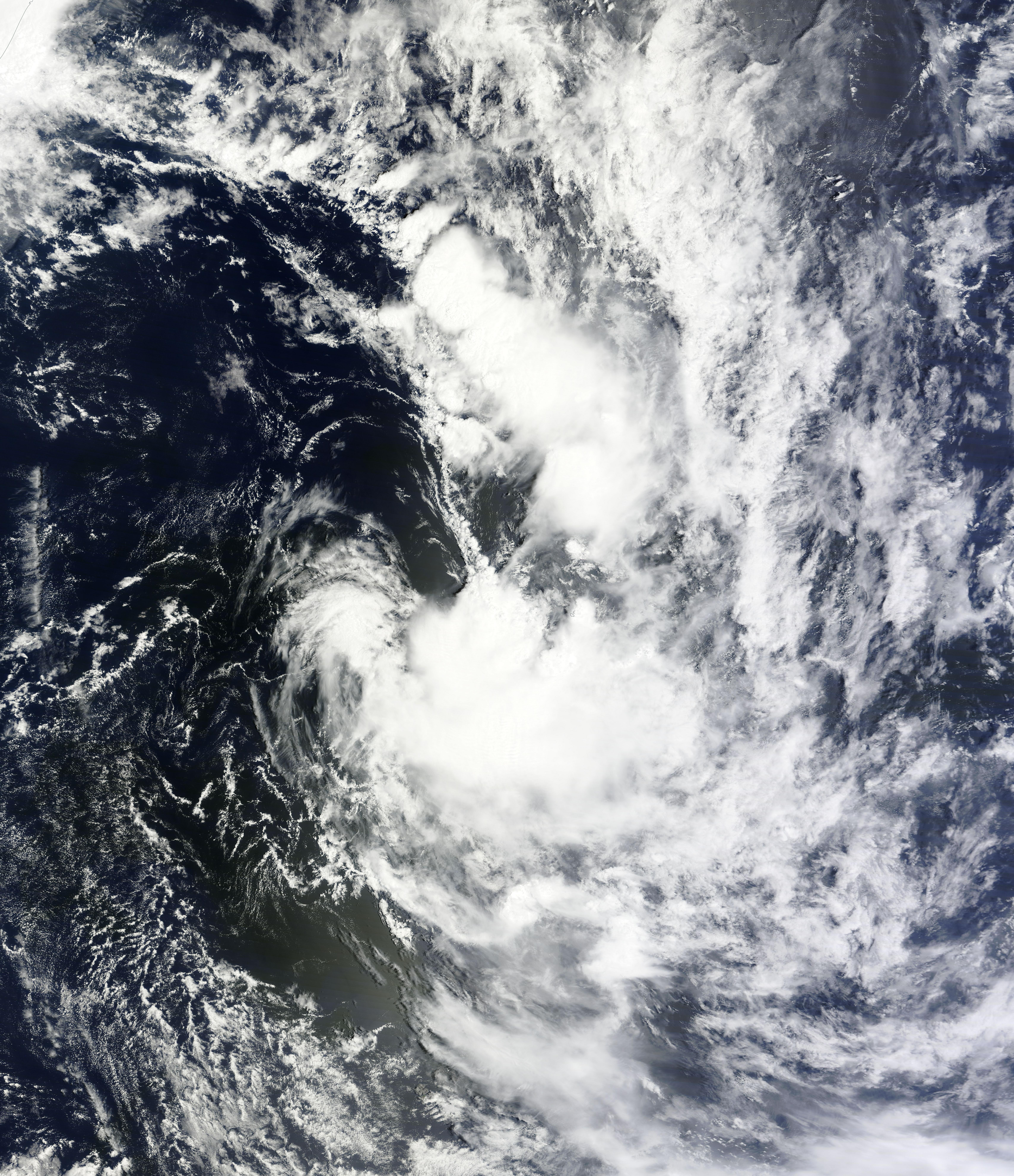
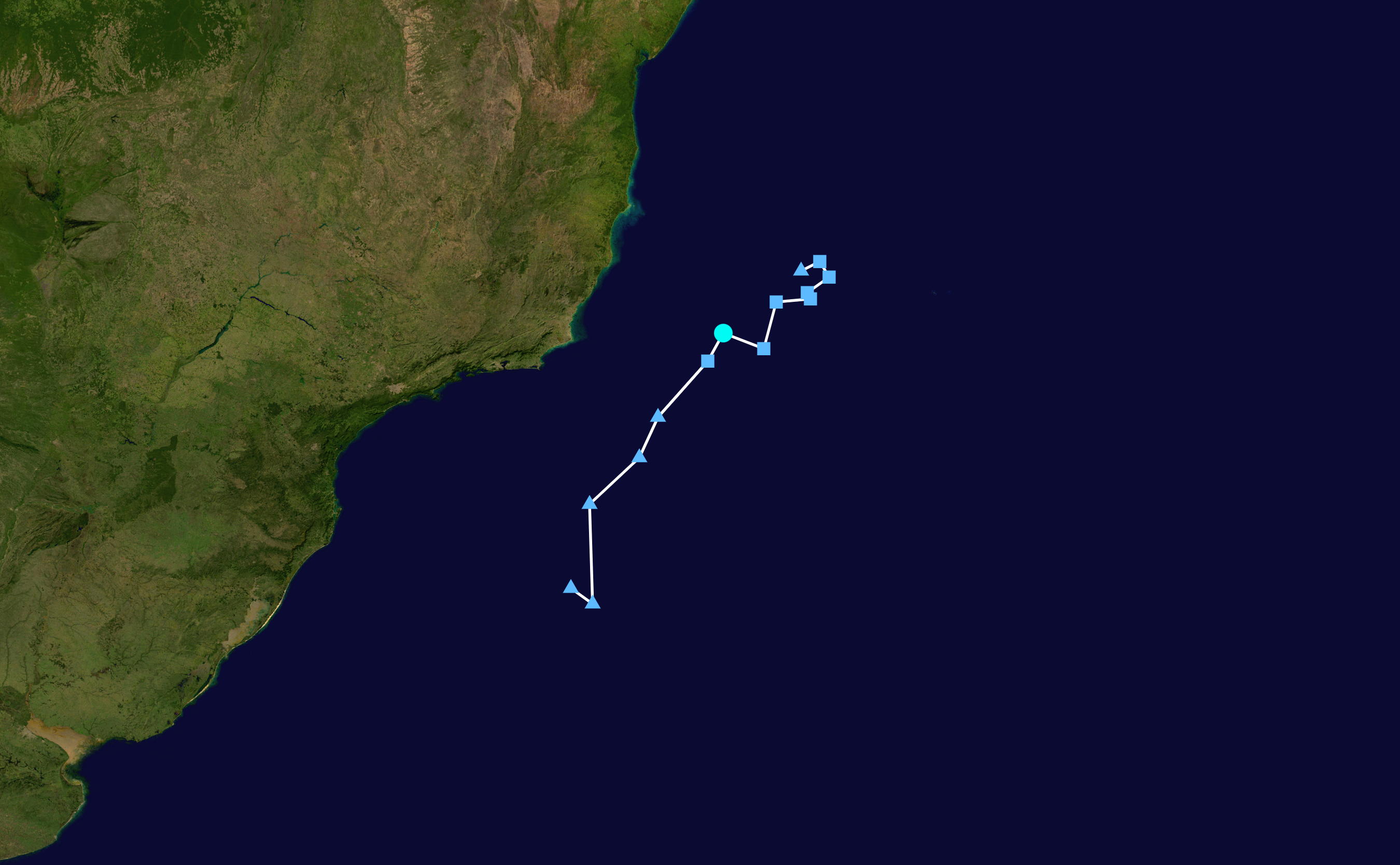
- Duration: 5 January 2016 – 7 January 2016
- Peak intensity: 55 km/h (35 mph) (1-min); 1006 hPa (mbar)

On 5 January 2016, the Hydrographic Center of the Brazilian Navy declared that a subtropical depression that formed from a dissipating extratropical cyclone, 325 nautical miles (600 km; 375 mi) east of Vitória, Espírito Santo. On the next day, while shfting from a westward movement to a southward one, other agencies considered the system an invest for possible tropical transition, designating it as 90Q. However, on 7 January, the system degenerated into a remnant low 495 nautical miles (915 km; 570 mi) east of the state of Rio de Janeiro.

=== Subtropical Storm Deni ===
- Subtropical storm (SSHWS)
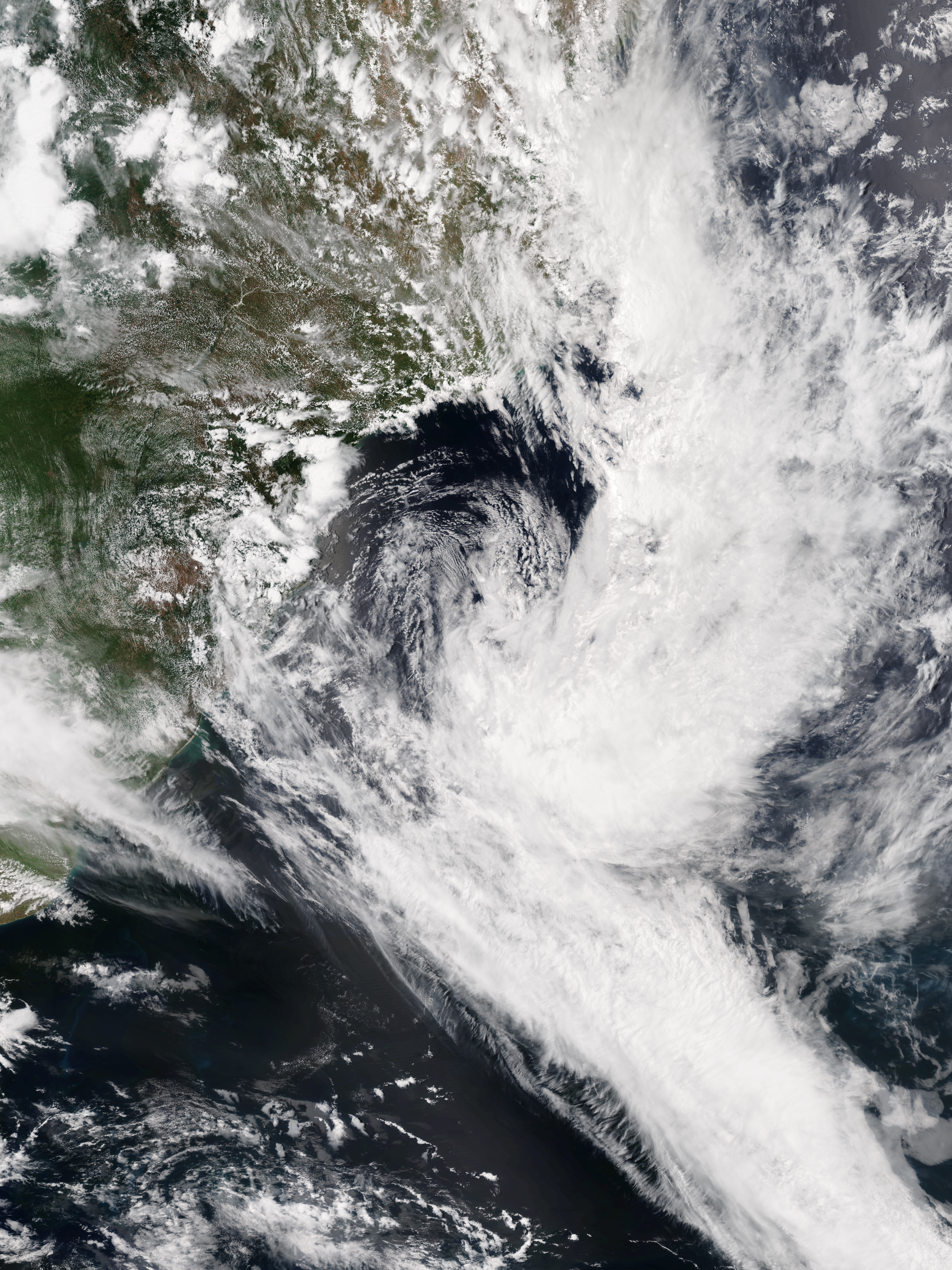
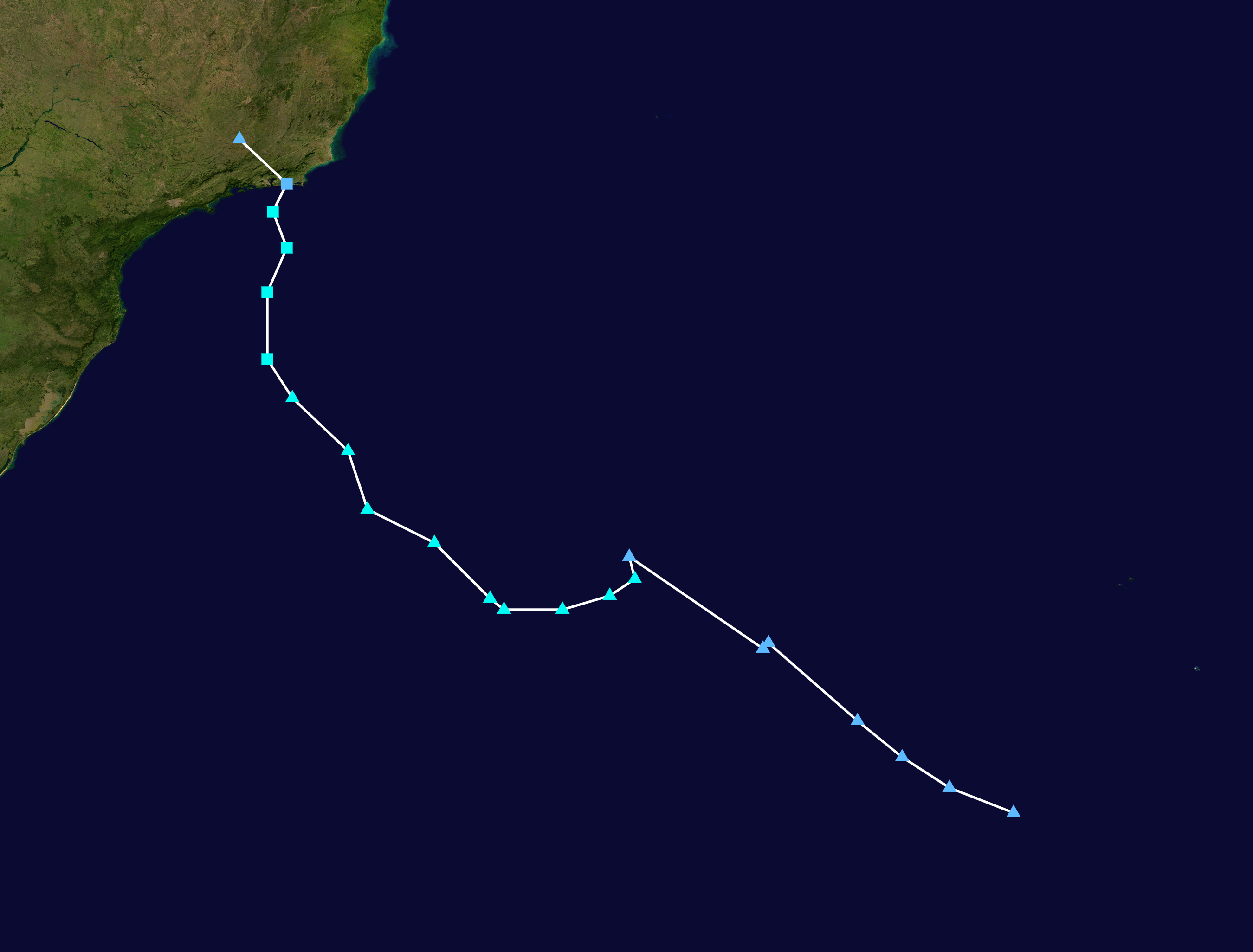
- Duration: 15 November 2016 – 16 November 2016
- Peak intensity: 75 km/h (45 mph) (1-min); 998 hPa (mbar)

On 15 November 2016, instability areas associated with a trough axis over Rio de Janeiro's coastline led to the formation of a subtropical depression southwest of it. It intensified into a subtropical storm and received the name Deni on 16 November. Moving south-southeastwards, Deni soon became extratropical shortly before 00:00 UTC on 17 November, where it was absorbed by a mid-latitude frontal system.

=== Subtropical Storm Eçaí ===
- Subtropical storm (SSHWS)
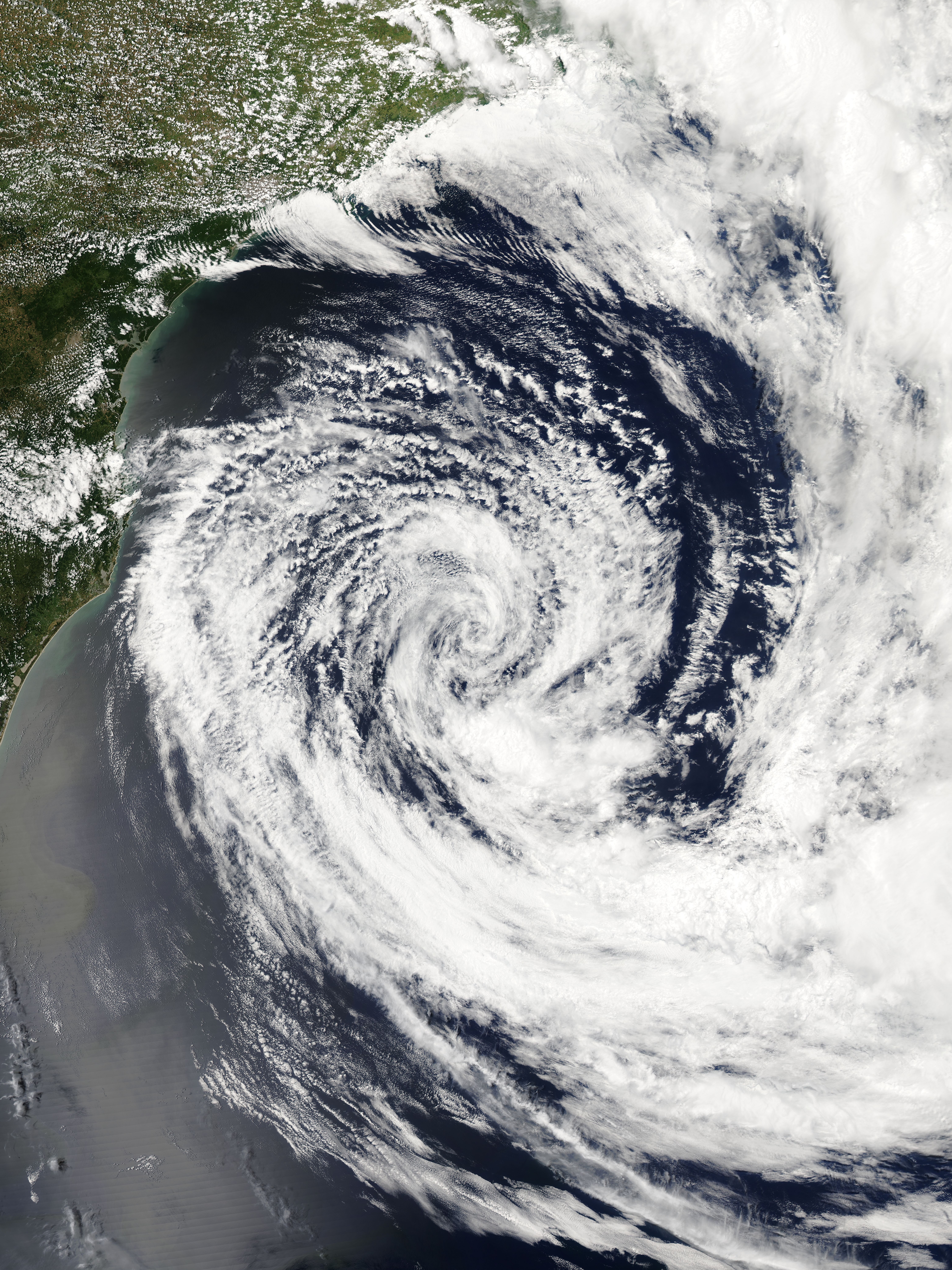
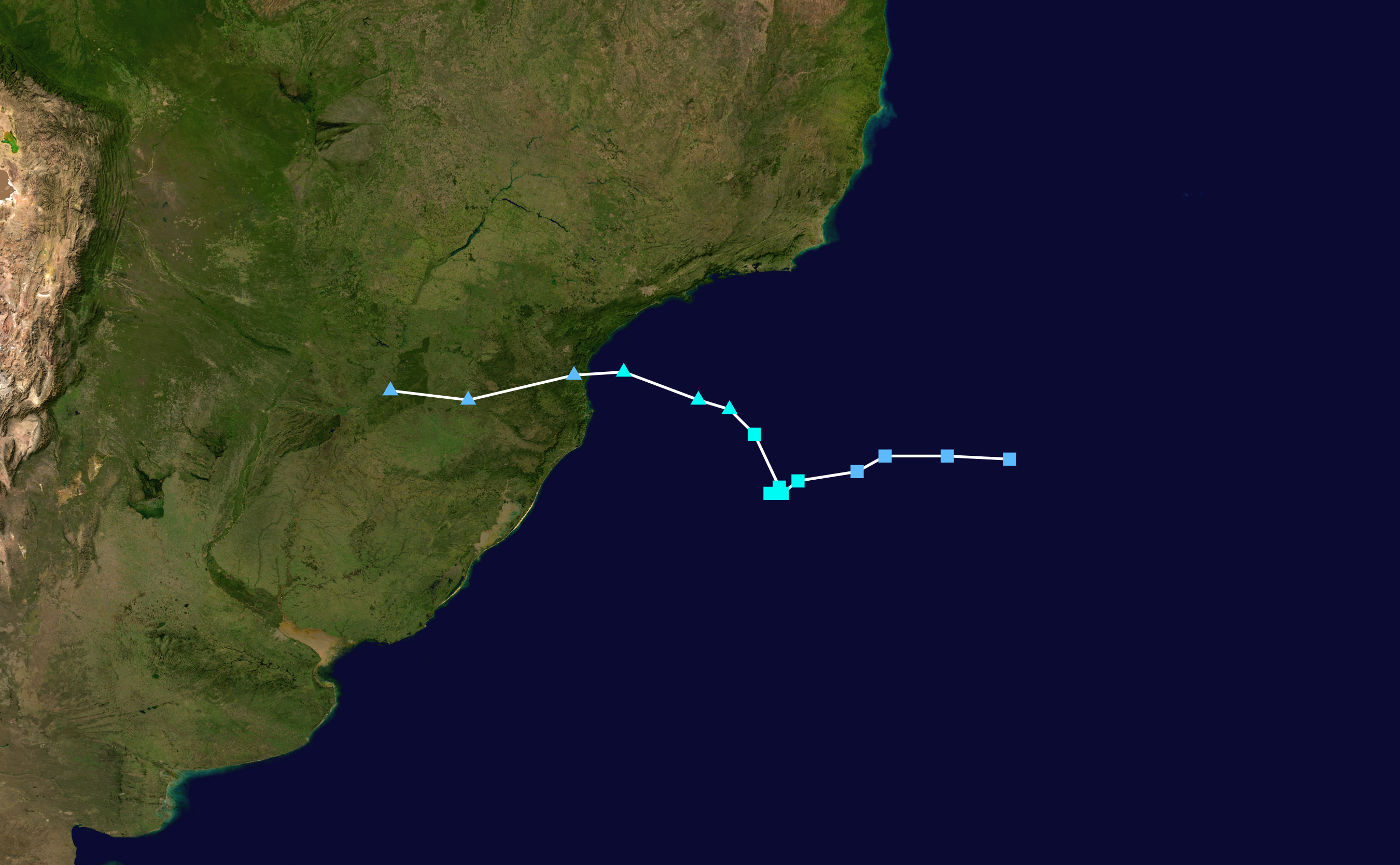
- Duration: 4 December 2016 – 6 December 2016
- Peak intensity: 100 km/h (65 mph) (1-min); 992 hPa (mbar)

An extratropical cyclone entered the South Atlantic Ocean from Santa Catarina early on 4 December 2016. Later, it intensified quickly and then transitioned into a subtropical storm shortly before 22:00 BRST (00:00 UTC on 5 December), with the name Eçaí assigned by the Hydrographic Center of the Brazilian Navy. Eçaí started to decay on 5 December as it moved Into cooler waters, and weakened into a subtropical depression at around 00:00 UTC on 6 December. As it decayed and lost its subtropical characteristics, its center divided in two, with the new center moving away southeastwards and the old one degrading into a remnant frontal low.

=== Subtropical Storm Guará ===
- Subtropical storm (SSHWS)
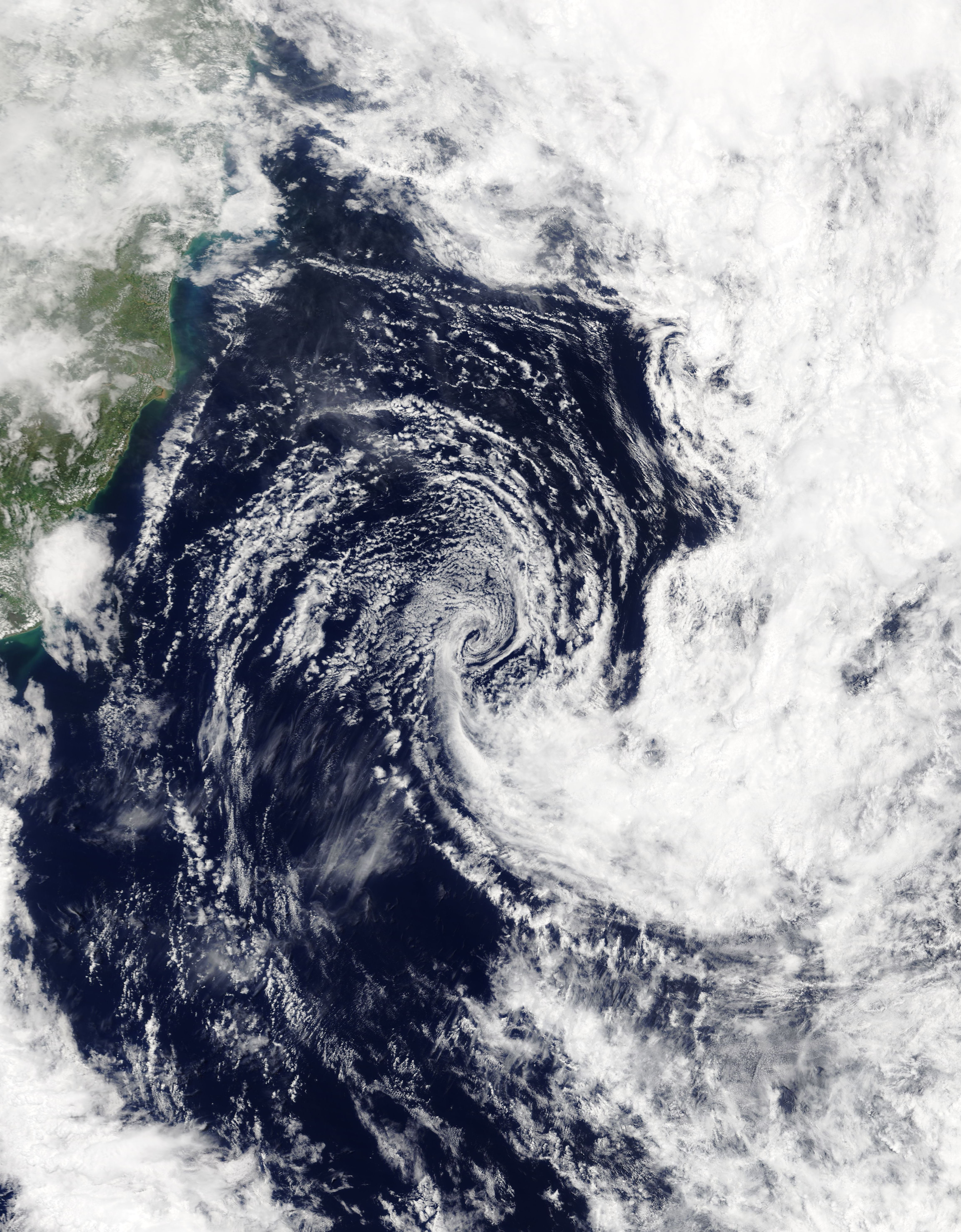
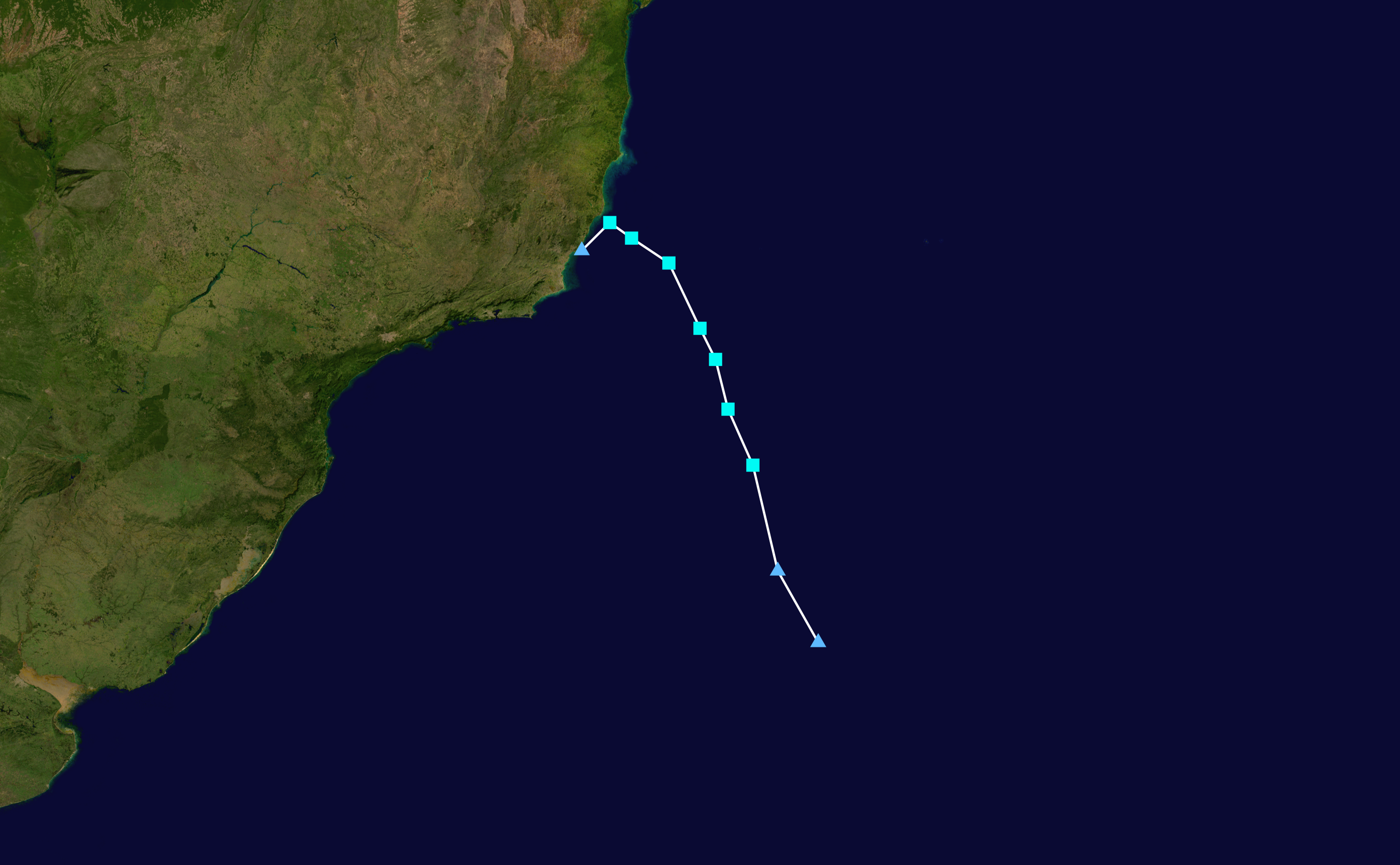
- Duration: 9 December 2017 – 10 December 2017
- Peak intensity: 75 km/h (45 mph) (1-min); 996 hPa (mbar)

On 8 December 2017 a South Atlantic Convergence Zone aligned with a trough axis led to the formation of several instability areas. On 9 December a subtropical storm formed from this setup, on border between Espírito Santo and Bahia, moving southeastwards away from land. On late 10 December, a Cold front pushed Guará southwards towards cooler waters, where it started transitioning into an extratropical cyclone. On early 11 December Guará attained its peak intensity, shortly thereafter degenerating into a low-pressure area associated with a trough axis.

=== Tropical Storm Iba ===
- Tropical storm (SSHWS)
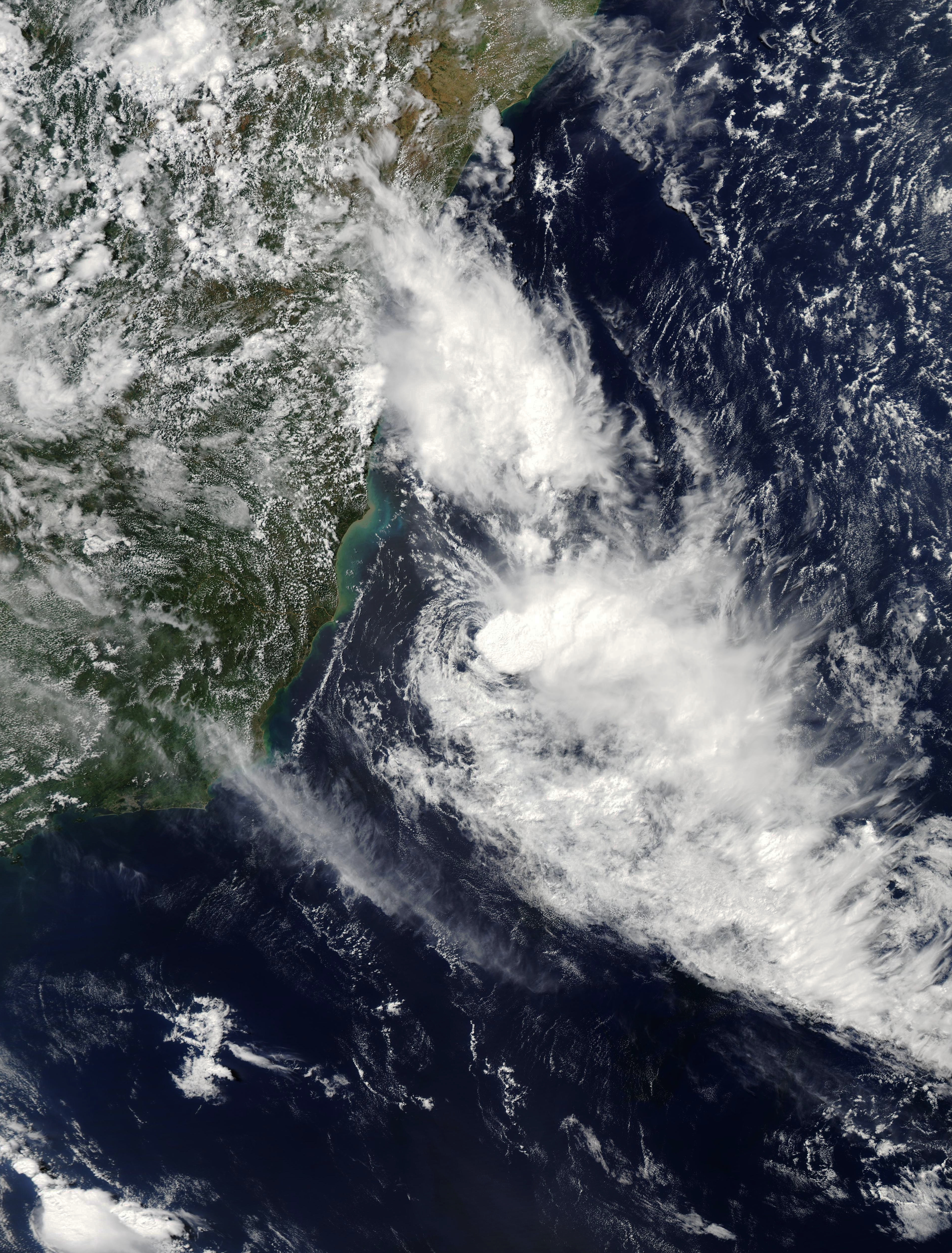
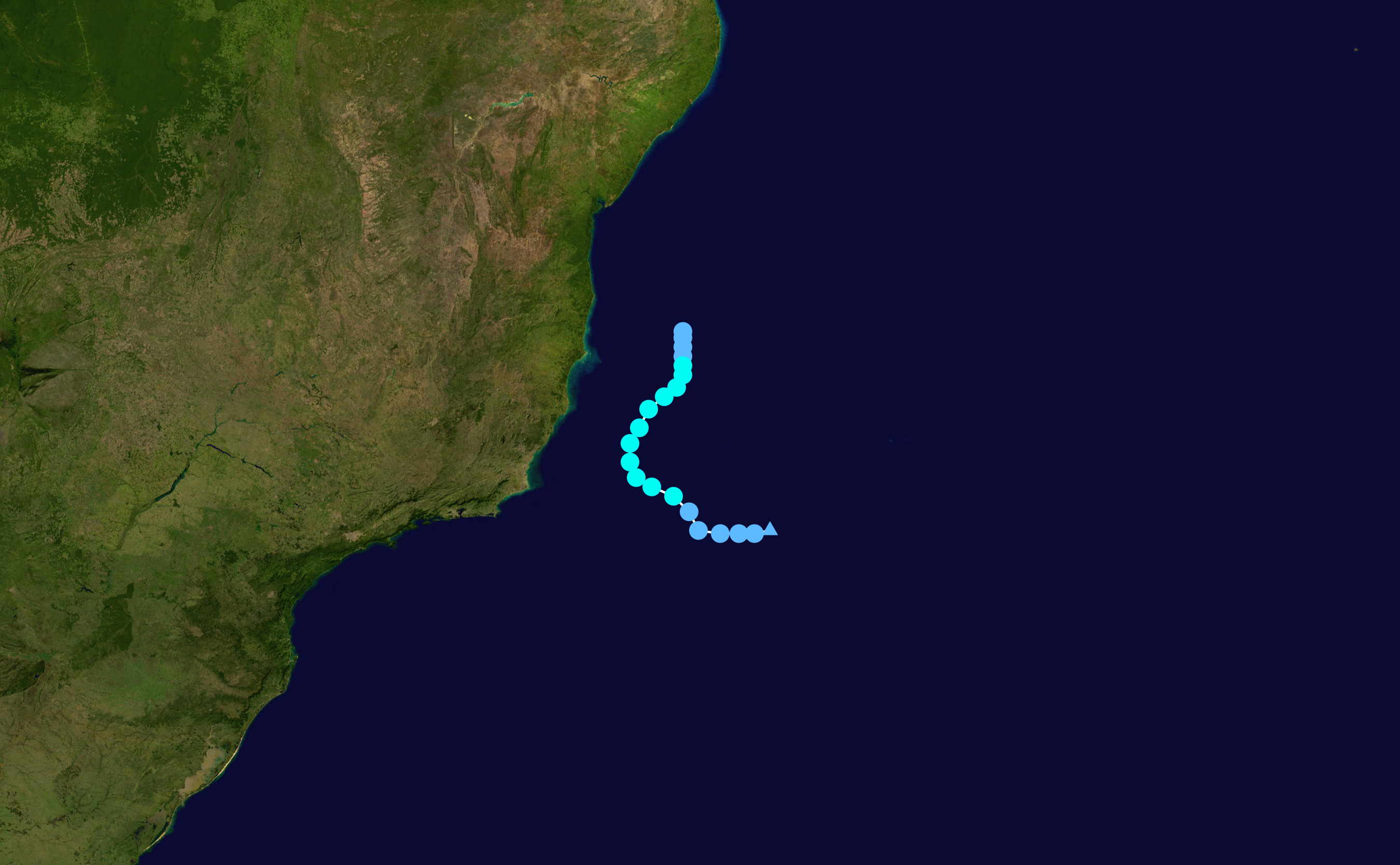
- Duration: 23 March 2019 – 27 March 2019
- Peak intensity: 85 km/h (50 mph) (1-min); 1006 hPa (mbar)

On 22 March 2019, a low-pressure area formed off the coast of Bahia after the passage of a frontal system. On the next day, the cyclone developed a deep warm-core, thus being designated as a tropical depression. On 24 March, the system intensified into a tropical storm, receiving the name Iba from the Brazilian Navy Hydrographic Center. After moving southwestward for a couple of days, on 26 March, Iba reached its peak intensity. Afterward, a cold front would approach the storm, which helped intensify the wind shear impacting Iba, leading to its weakening and extratropical transition. On early 28 March, Iba would degenerate into a remnant low, becoming fully extratropical a day later.

Iba was the first tropical storm to develop in the basin since Anita in 2010, as well as the first fully tropical system to be named from the Brazilian naming list.

=== Subtropical Storm Jaguar ===
- Subtropical storm (SSHWS)
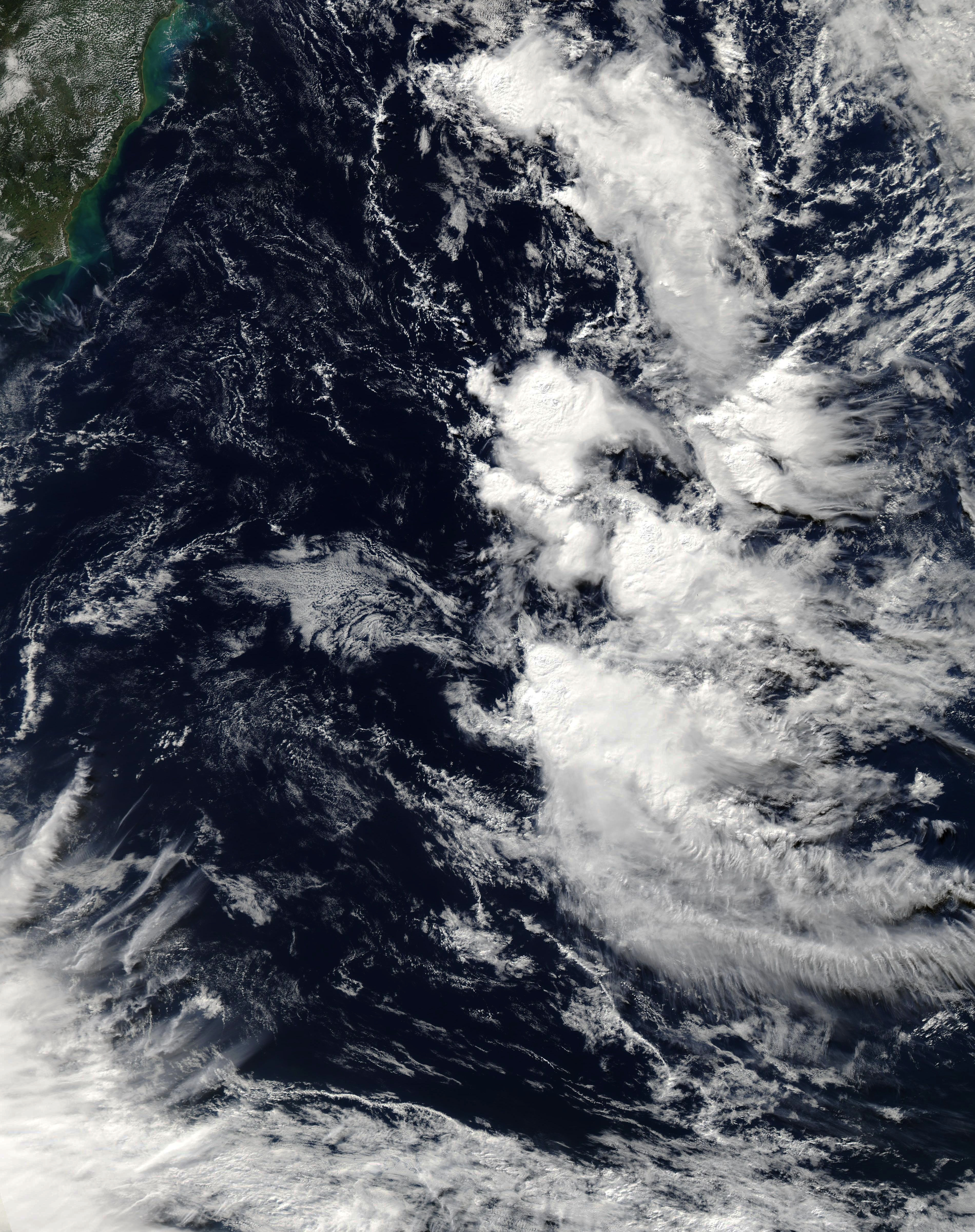
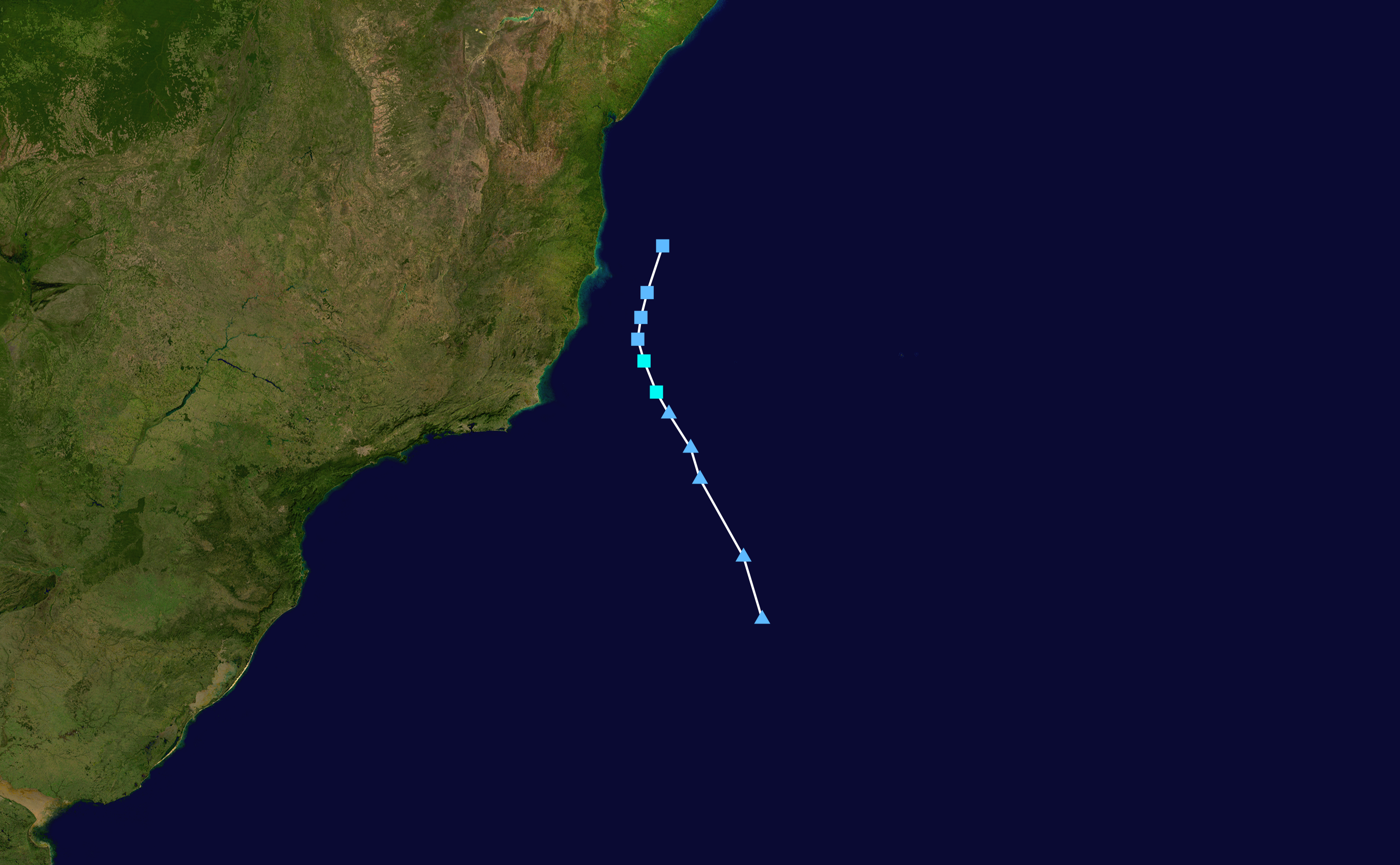
- Duration: 19 May 2019 – 21 May 2019
- Peak intensity: 65 km/h (40 mph) (1-min); 1010 hPa (mbar)

On 19 May 2019 several instability areas formed from a trough axis off the coast of Espírito Santo, which later coalesced into a subtropical depression. On 20 May, the system strengthened into a subtropical storm, receiving the name Jaguar from the Brazilian Navy Hydrographic Center. However, the system did not intensify any further, as it soon encountered unfavorable conditions while moving southeastwards, weakening into a subtropical depression on early 21 May. Later that day, Jaguar degenerated into several sparse instability areas associated with a low-pressure area, which was absorbed by a frontal system on 22 May.

=== Other systems (2010s) ===
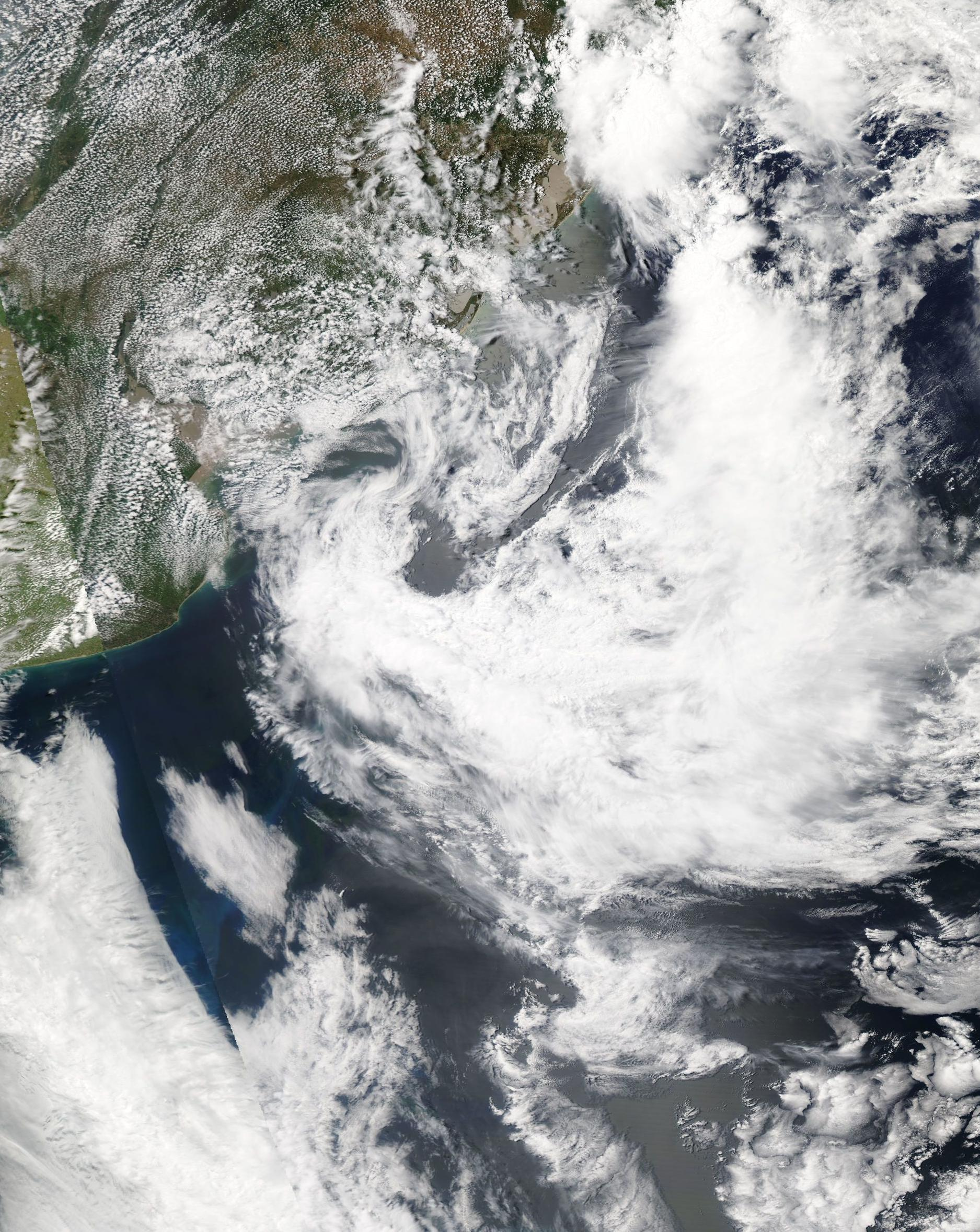
A subtropical storm in November 2010

- On 16 November 2010, a cold-core mid to upper-level trough in phase with a low-level warm-core low developed a low-pressure system over Brazil, and moved southeastward into the South Atlantic, where it slightly deepened. The system brought locally heavy rains in southern Brazil and northeast of Uruguay that exceeded 200 millimeters within a few hours, in some locations of Southern Rio Grande do Sul, northwest of Pelotas. Damages and flooding were observed in Cerrito, São Lourenço do Sul and Pedro Osório. Bañado de Pajas, department of Cerro Largo in Uruguay, recorded 240 mm (9.4 in) of rain. The subtropical cyclone then became a weak trough on 19 November, according to the CPTEC.
- Between 23 December 2013 and 24 January 2015, the CPTEC and Navy Hydrography Center monitored three additional subtropical depressions to the south of Rio de Janeiro. The first one lasted until Christmas Day, 2013. Two subtropical depressions formed in 2014: one in late-February 2014 and the other in late-March 2014.

== 2020s ==
=== Subtropical Storm Kurumí ===
- Subtropical storm (SSHWS)
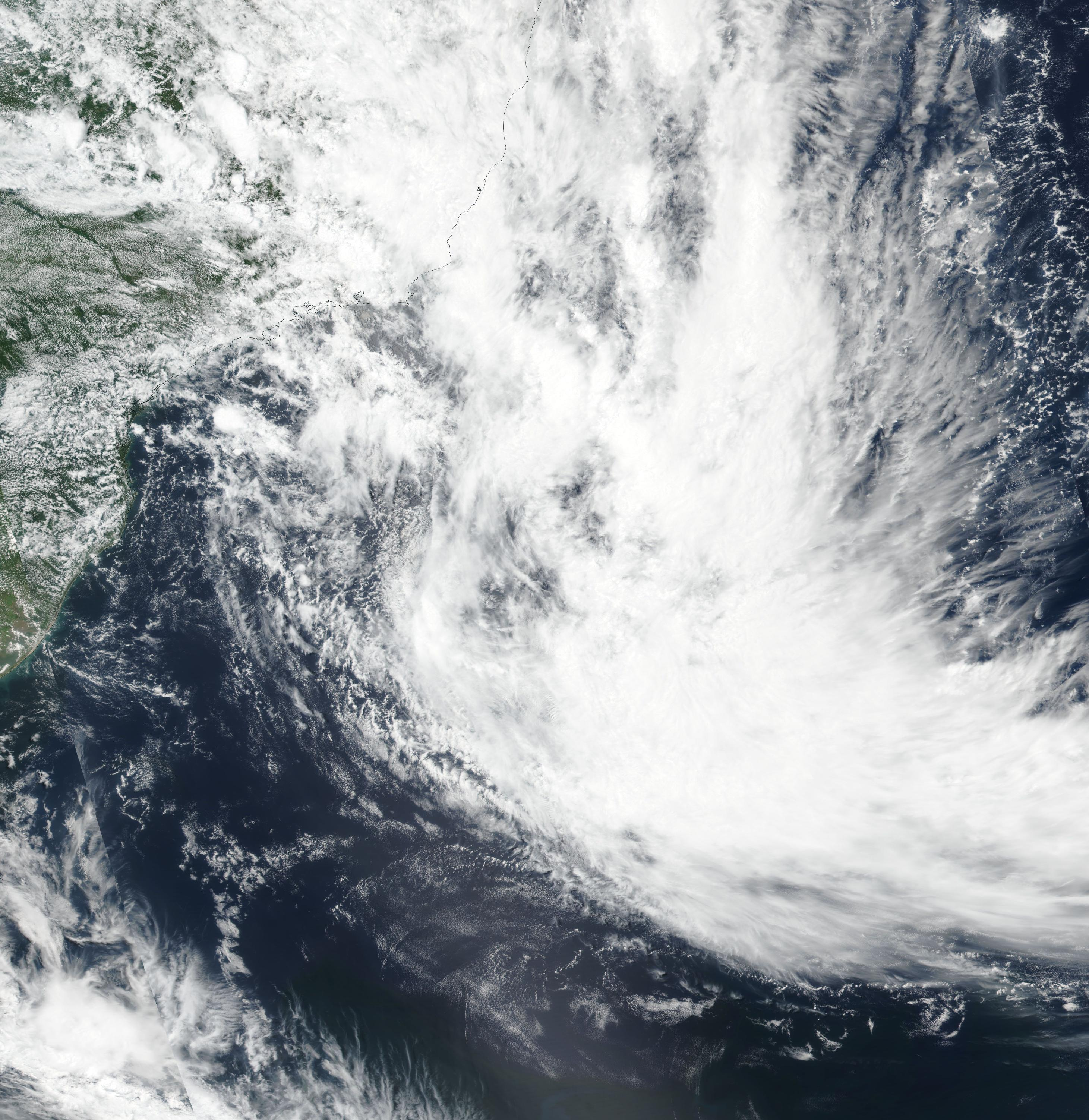
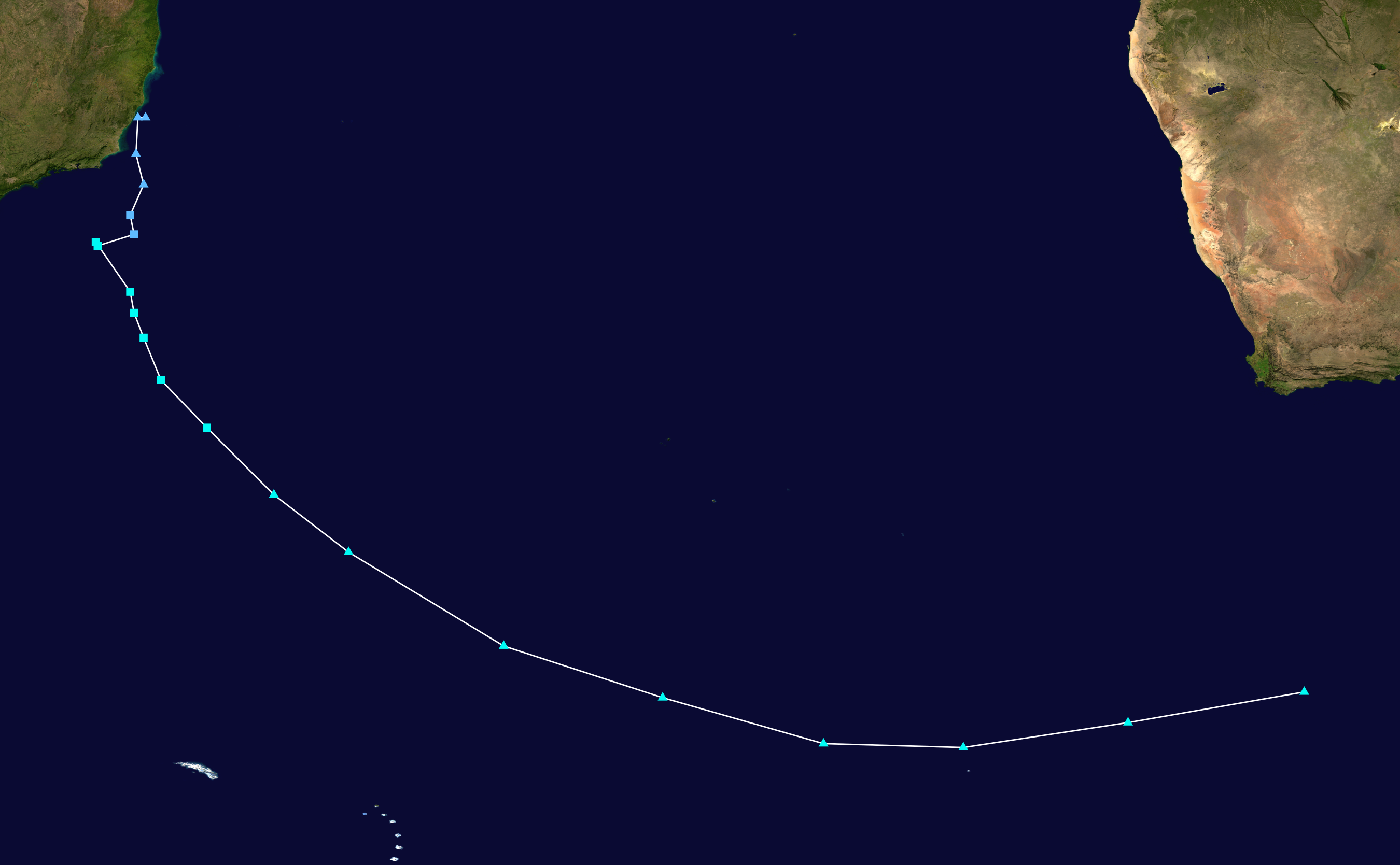
- Duration: 23 January 2020 – 24 January 2020
- Peak intensity: 65 km/h (40 mph) (1-min); 998 hPa (mbar)

On 21 January 2020, the Brazilian Navy Hydrographic Center began monitoring an area of persisting thunderstorms near São Paulo for potential subtropical cyclone development. Generally tracking southeastward, the system began to organize within the afternoon of 22 January, aided by the establishment of a South Atlantic Convergence Zone, and was designated a subtropical depression early on 23 January. Several hours later, due to a lack of wind shear, the system intensified into a subtropical storm and was given the name Kurumí. After this bout of intensification, Kurumí moved southward and began to succumb to much more unfavorable conditions. It weakened back to a subtropical depression on late 24 January, due to an intensification of wind shear over its circulation due to the formation of an extratropical cyclone to its southeast. The last advisory was issued on Kurumí later that same day, as it degenerated into a trough while also beginning to merge with the nearby frontal system.

The front associated with Kurumí would later play a role in the 2020 Brazilian floods and mudslides, producing heavy rainfall. Over 171.8 mm (6.76 in) of rain fell in the Belo Horizonte metro area on 24 January, triggering a landslide and killing 3 people and leaving 1 missing.

=== Subtropical Storm Mani ===
- Subtropical storm (SSHWS)
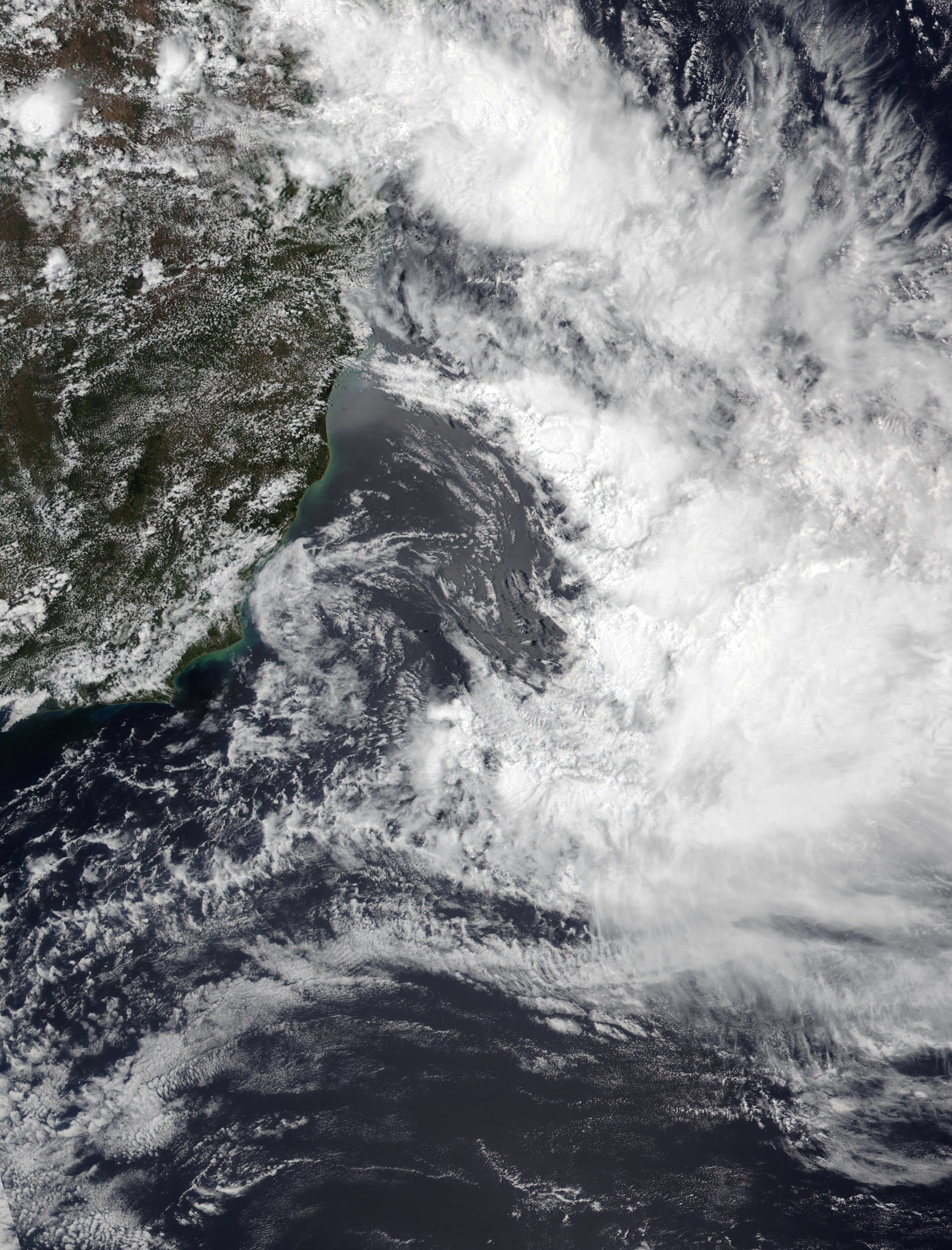
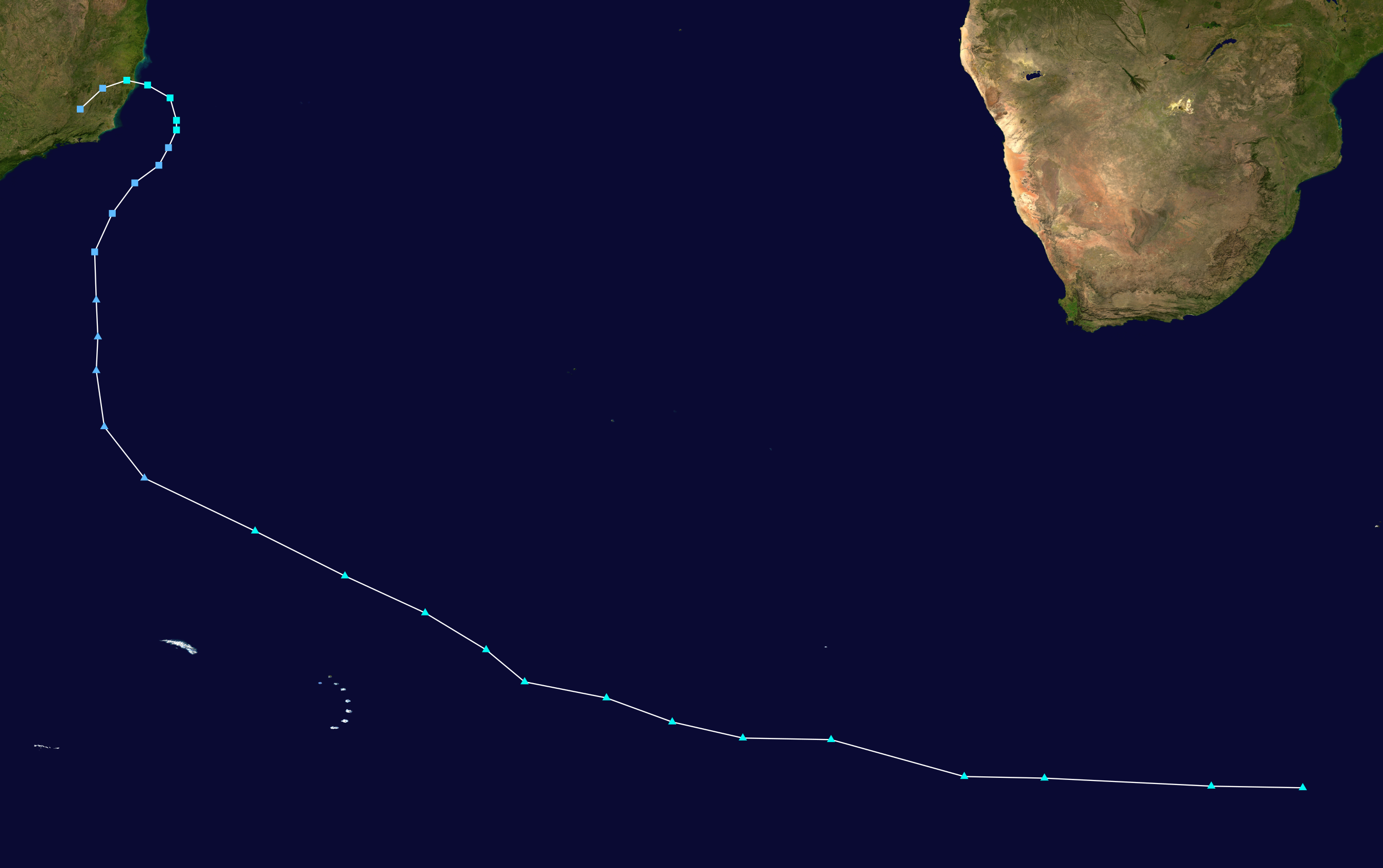
- Duration: 25 October 2020 – 27 October 2020
- Peak intensity: 65 km/h (40 mph) (1-min); 1004 hPa (mbar)

On 24 October 2020, a trough axis persisted off the coast of the border between Espírito Santo and Bahia, which led to the formation of a subtropical depression on the next day. Later that day it intensified into a subtropical storm, which led it to be named Mani at 00:00 UTC on 26 October. As it moved away from a South Atlantic Convergence Zone on 27 October, Mani gradually lost its subtropical characteristics, until it weakened to a low pressure area.

The storm caused significant damage in Espírito Santo, with landslides of stones and earth leaving more than 400 people homeless. The storm also impacted almost the entire state of Minas Gerais and the northern region of Rio de Janeiro.

=== Subtropical Storm Oquira ===
- Subtropical storm (SSHWS)
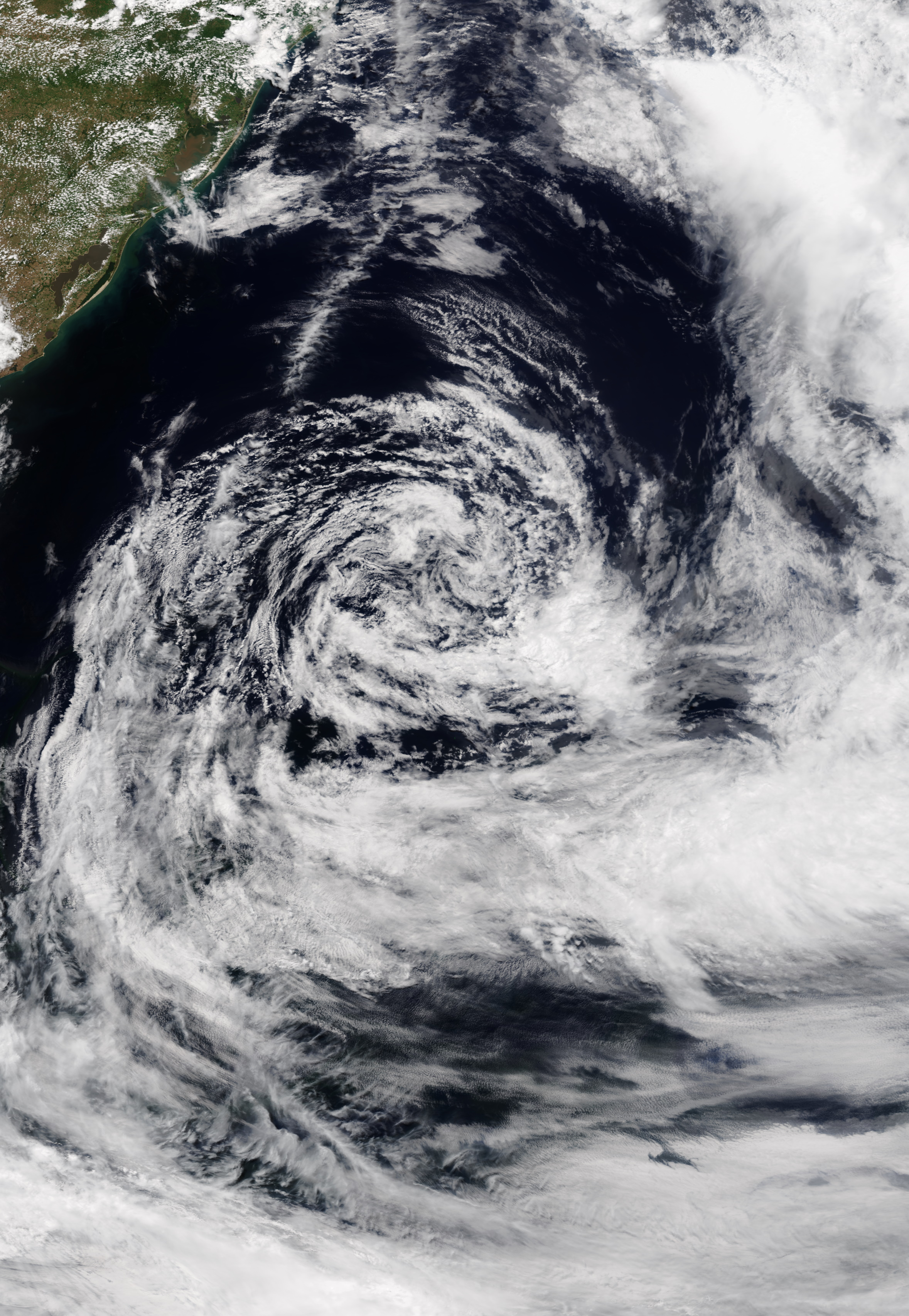
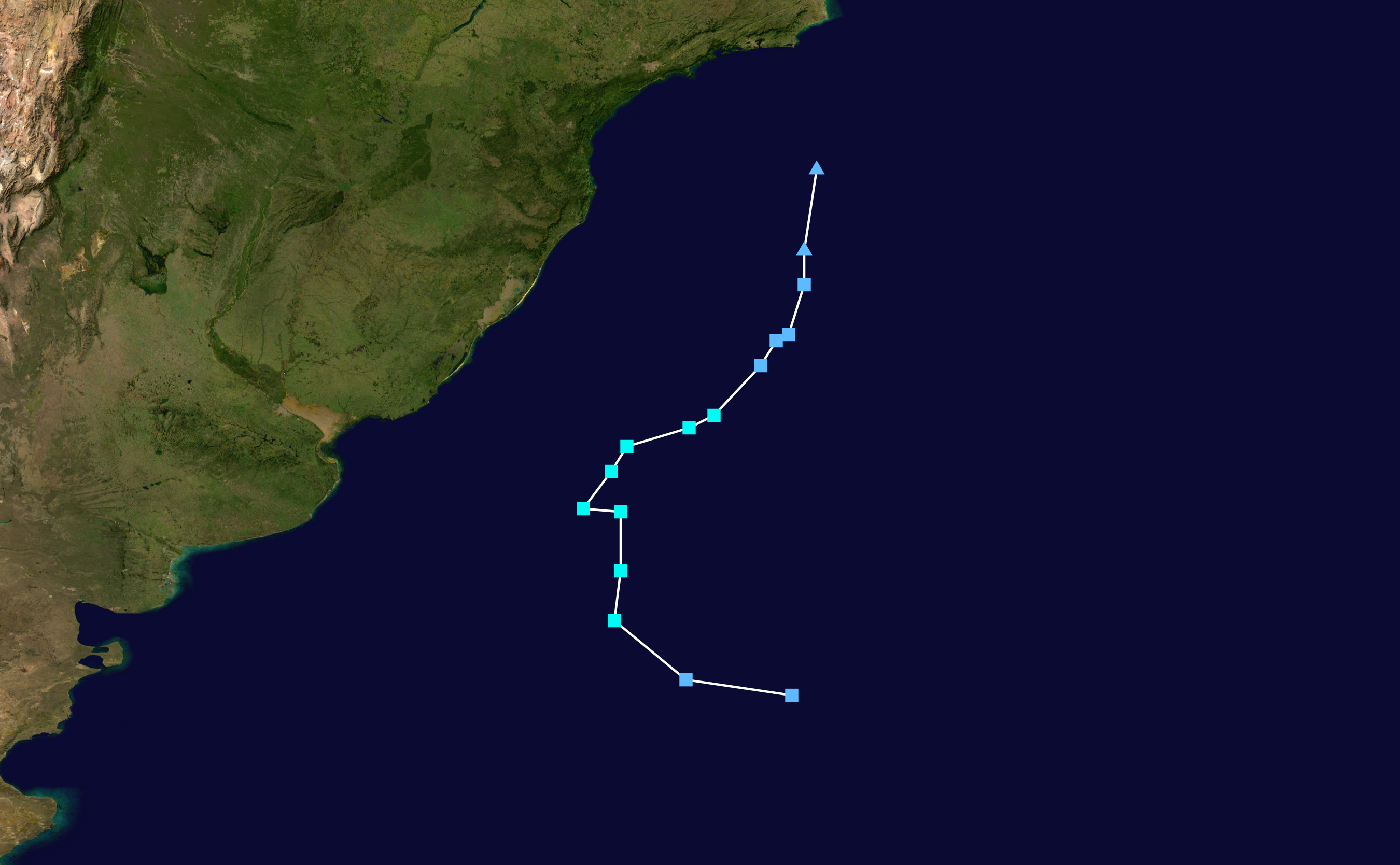
- Duration: 27 December 2020 – 30 December 2020
- Peak intensity: 65 km/h (40 mph) (1-min); 998 hPa (mbar)

On 26 December 2020, the prior presence of a South Atlantic Convergence Zone and the subsequent passage of a frontal system led to the presence of several instability areas off the coast east of Rio Grande do Sul, which coalesced into a subtropical depression a day later. Moving southwestward, the system's central pressure dropped to 1,010 millibars (30 inHg) by 00:00 UTC on 28 December. Later that day, the system's winds intensified, and it was named Oquira by the Brazilian Hydrographic Center. On 29 December, Oquira continued to strengthen, deepening while heading further southwestward away from the Brazilian mainland, and reaching a pressure of 1,002 millibars (29.6 inHg). Afterwards, Oquira's movements shifted southeastwards, and its winds decreased as it started to lose its subtropical characteristics, weakening to a subtropical depression on 30 December, but its pressure continued to drop, bottoming out at a minimum central pressure of 998 millibars (29.5 inHg). Later that day, Oquira transitioned into an extratropical low, and the Hydrographic Center issued their final advisory on the storm as it was absorbed by a frontal system.

=== Tropical Storm 01Q ===
- Tropical storm (SSHWS)
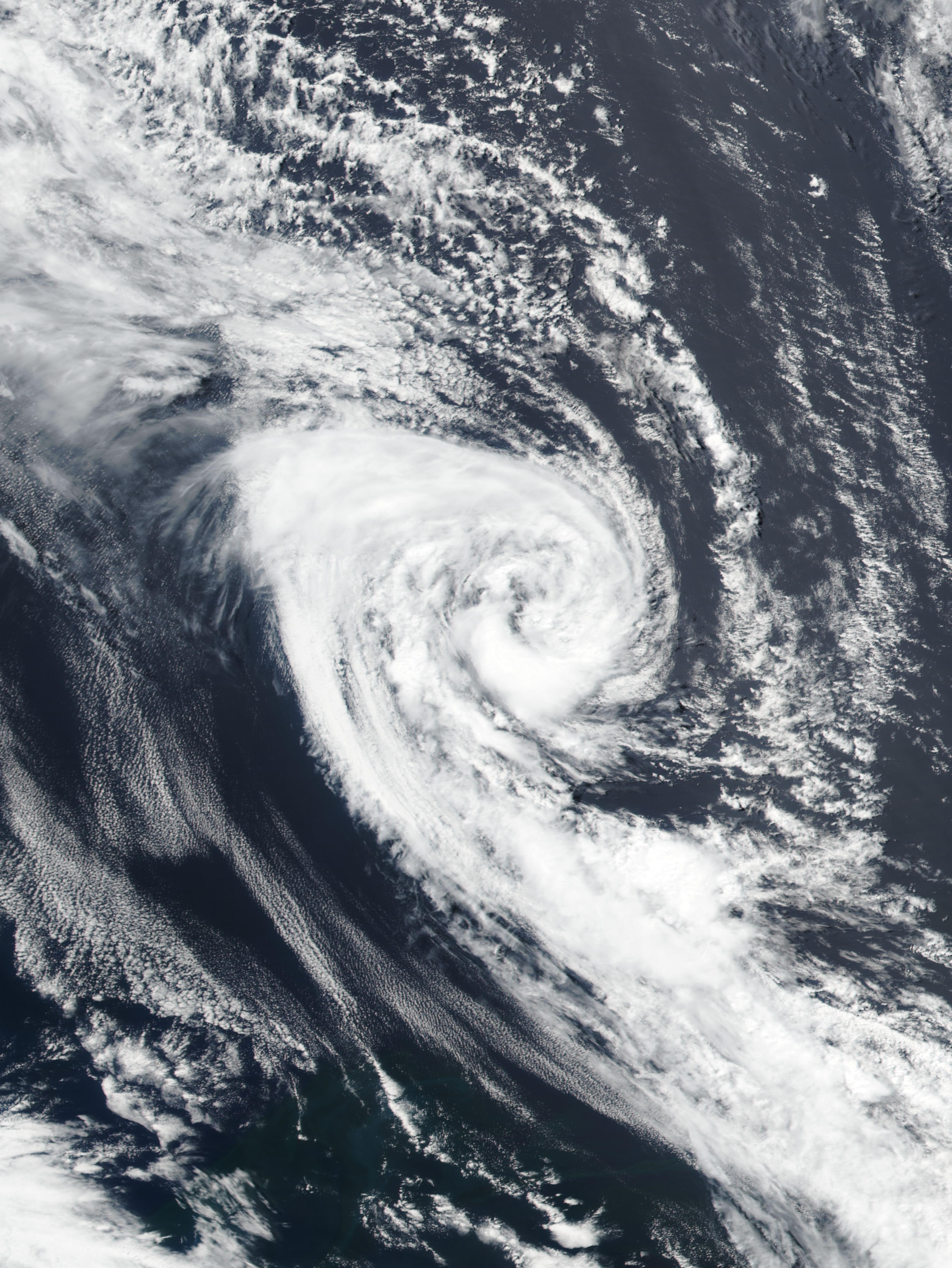
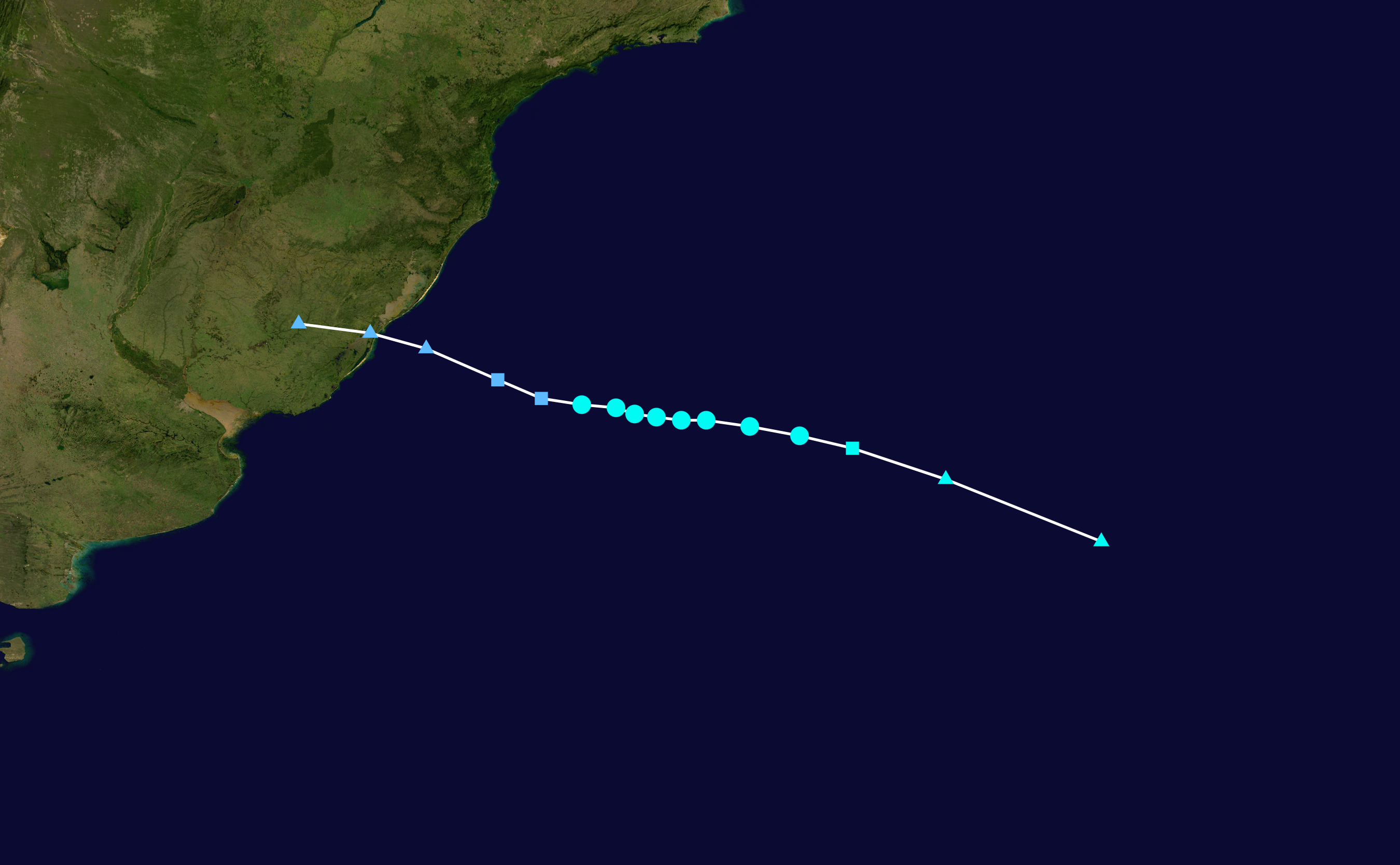
- Duration: 4 February 2021 – 6 February 2021
- Peak intensity: 65 km/h (40 mph) (1-min); 990 hPa (mbar)

On 4 February 2021, an extratropical storm off the coast of Rio Grande do Sul developed into a bomb cyclone. On 6 February, the storm began separating from its weather fronts and developed subtropical characteristics, before fully separating from the frontal zone and transitioning into a fully-tropical storm later that day. As a result, the NOAA classified the system as a tropical storm at 17:30 UTC, with the system being designated as Tropical Storm 01Q. However, the storm was short-lived, as it lost its tropical characteristics several hours later, with the NOAA issuing their final bulletin on the storm at 23:30 UTC that day. The storm dissipated soon afterward. Although the NOAA issued bulletins on the storm, the Hydrographic Center of the Brazilian Navy did not monitor it.

=== Subtropical Depression #01-2021 ===
- Subtropical depression (SSHWS)
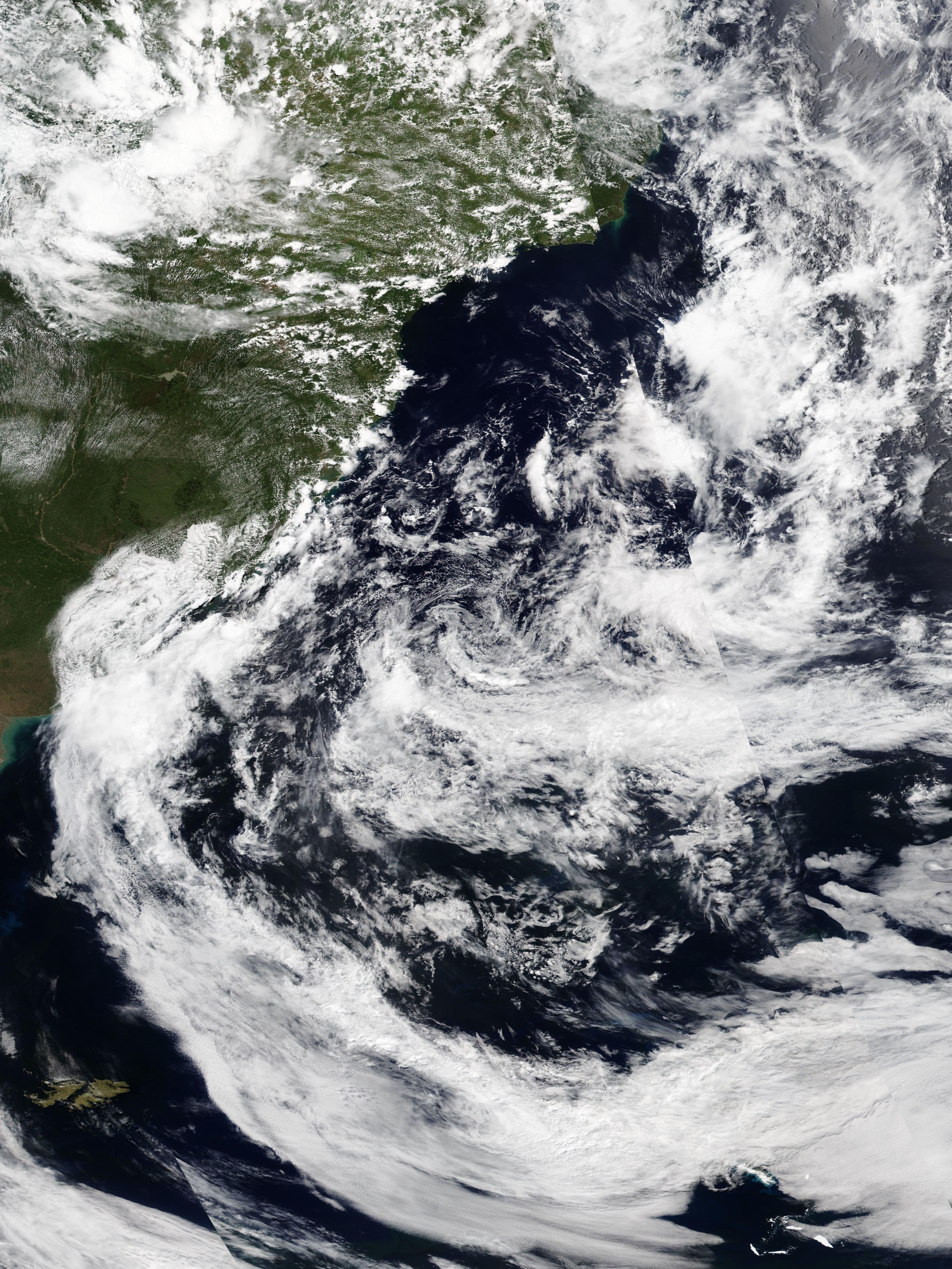
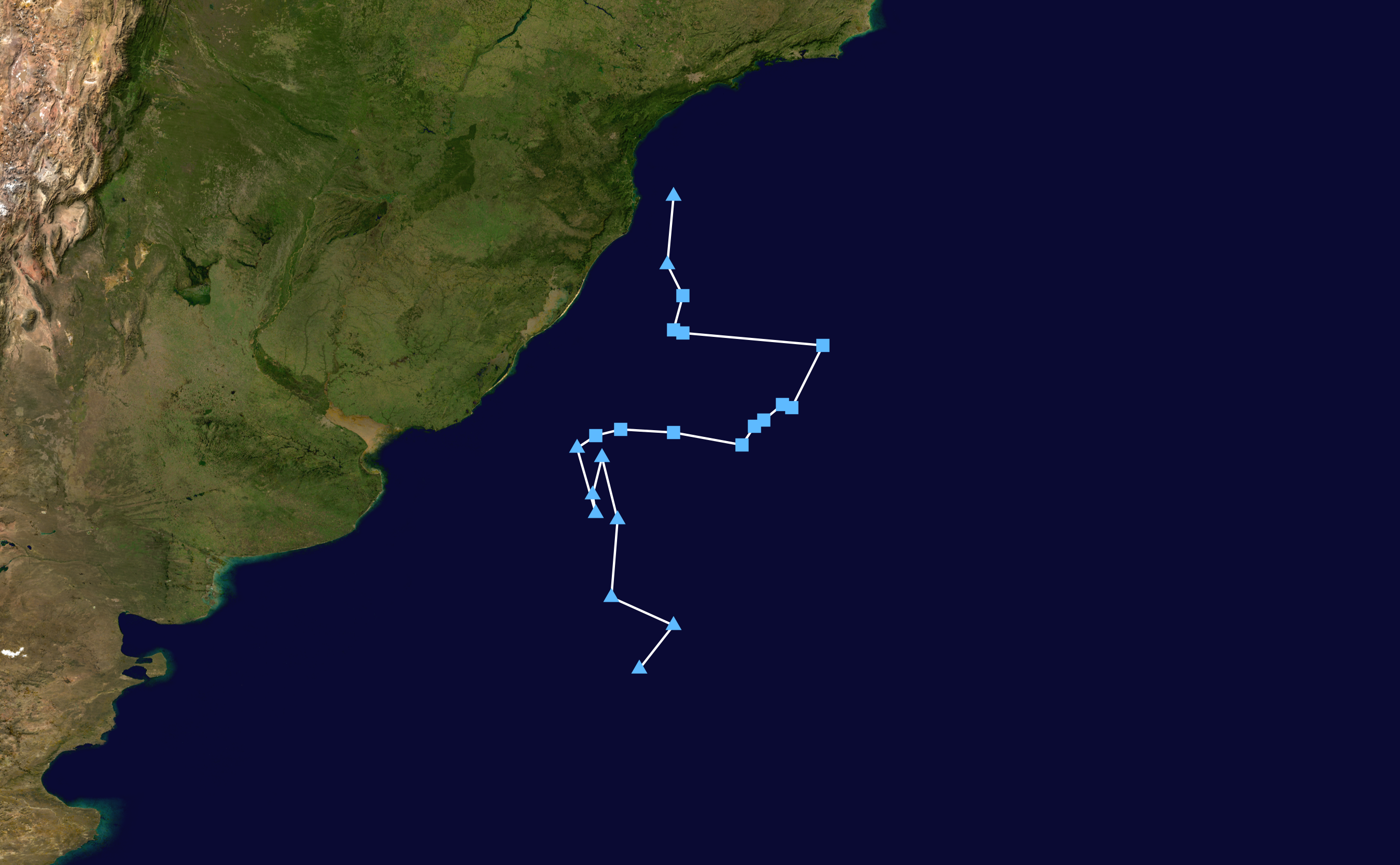
- Duration: 14 February 2021 – 16 February 2021
- Peak intensity: 55 km/h (35 mph) (1-min); 1002 hPa (mbar)

On 13 February 2021, instability areas associated with a low-pressure area off the coast of the state of Rio Grande do Sul acquired subtropical characteristics on the next day, becoming a subtropical depression about 700 kilometres (430 mi) from the state. For the next few days, the storm slowly meandered southeastward and then southwestward alongside a trough axis to its east, until it lost its subtropical characteristics over high seas on 17 February, becoming a remnant low.

The Brazilian Navy noted in its post-season analysis that on late 14 February the system could have intensified into a subtropical storm, since the radiometer built into the AMSR-2 satellite found winds of 35 knots, but it wasn't upgraded because no other measurement confirmed such findings.

=== Subtropical Storm Potira ===
- Subtropical storm (SSHWS)
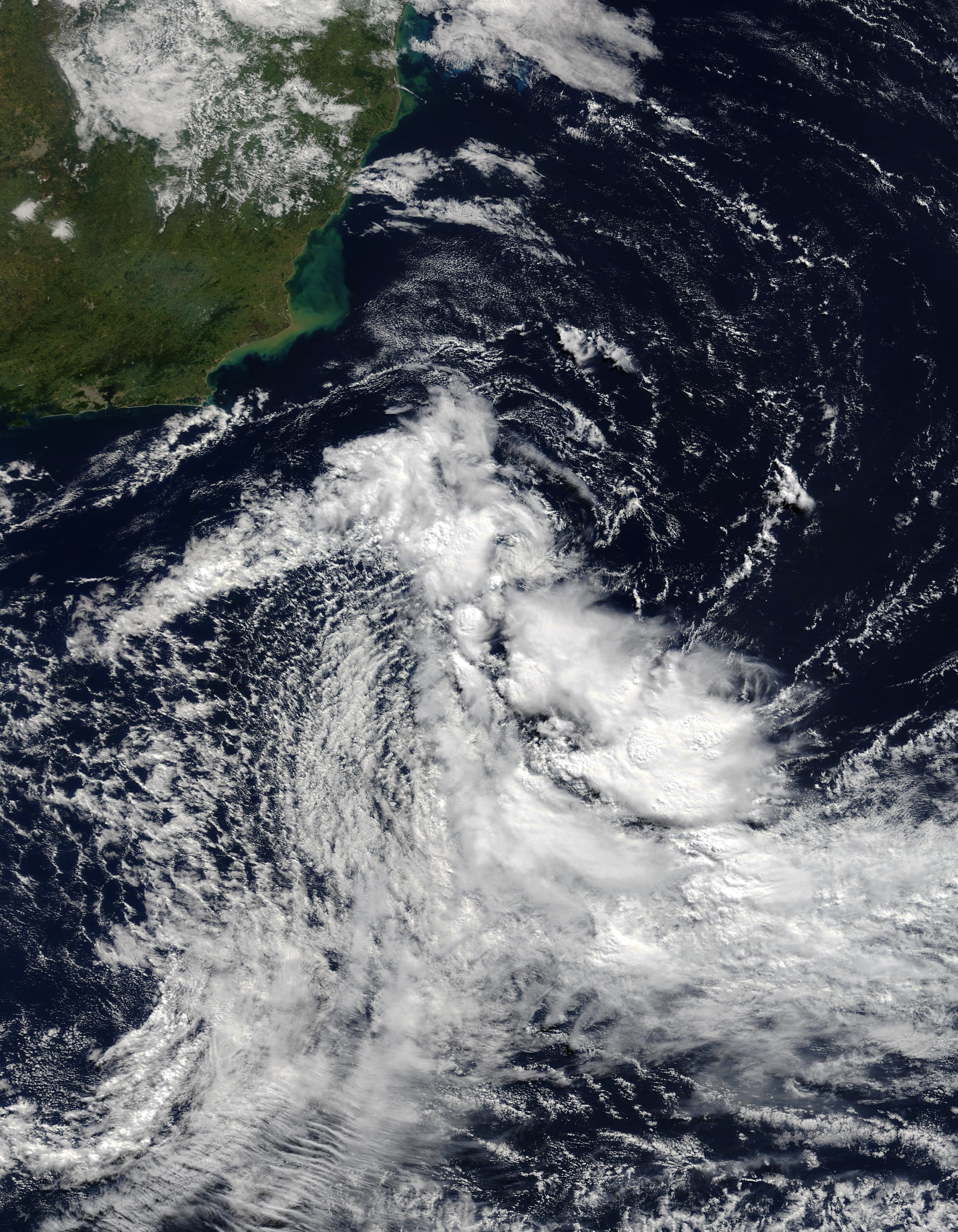
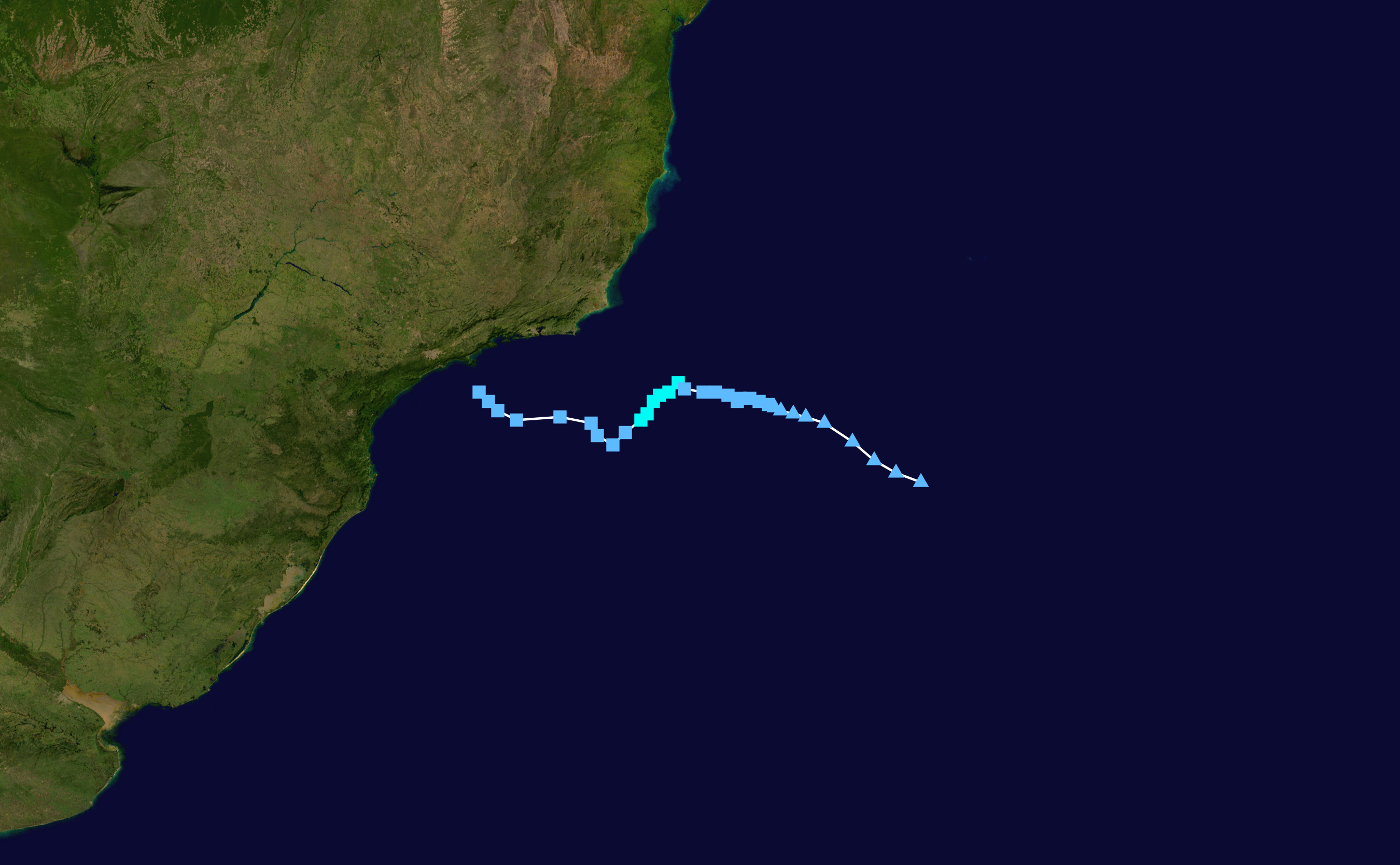
- Duration: 19 April 2021 – 24 April 2021
- Peak intensity: 75 km/h (45 mph) (1-min); 1006 hPa (mbar)

A low south of Rio de Janeiro transitioned into a subtropical depression on 19 April 2021. On 20 April 2021, the system intensified into a subtropical storm, which Brazilian Navy then decided to name it Potira. Potira moved slowly northeastwards for a couple of days over unusually warmer waters, favorable upper-level tropospheric winds and strong low-level convergence, which led to its intensification and persistence of its peak intensity until 23 April. As it completed a clockwise loop, Potira weakened into a subtropical depression, with the Brazilian Navy downgrading it to a low-pressure area on late 24 January.

The storm caused a gale in the Copacabana fort and the gusts of wind went over 60 km/h (37 mph). In the municipalities of Balneário Camboriú and Florianópolis (SC), the hangover caused by Potira caused flooding in the streets and damage to the sidewalks. The ports of Itajaí and Navegantes were closed for 3 days. No economic or material damage caused by the cyclone has been reported.

=== Subtropical Storm Raoni ===
- Subtropical storm (SSHWS)
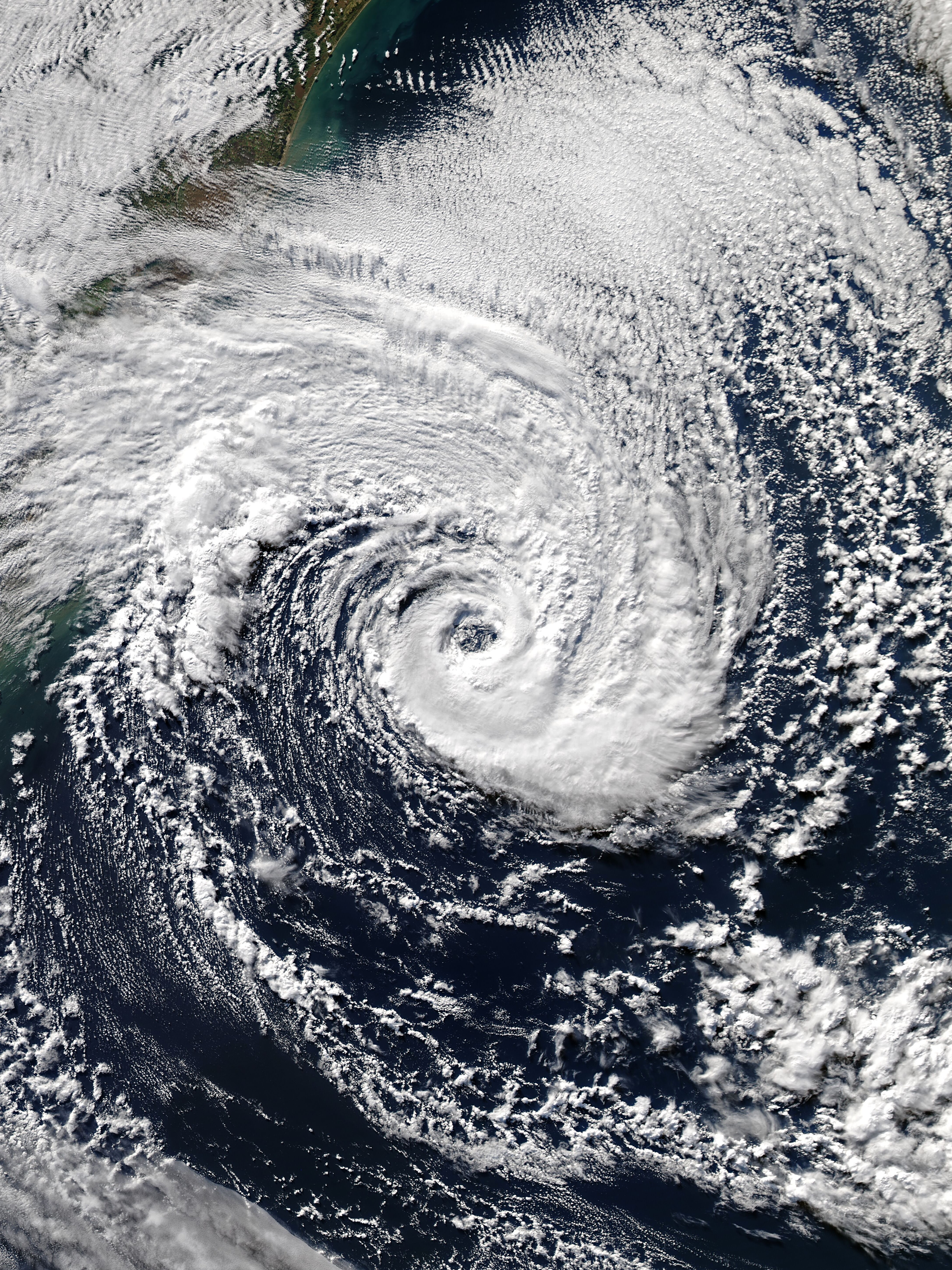
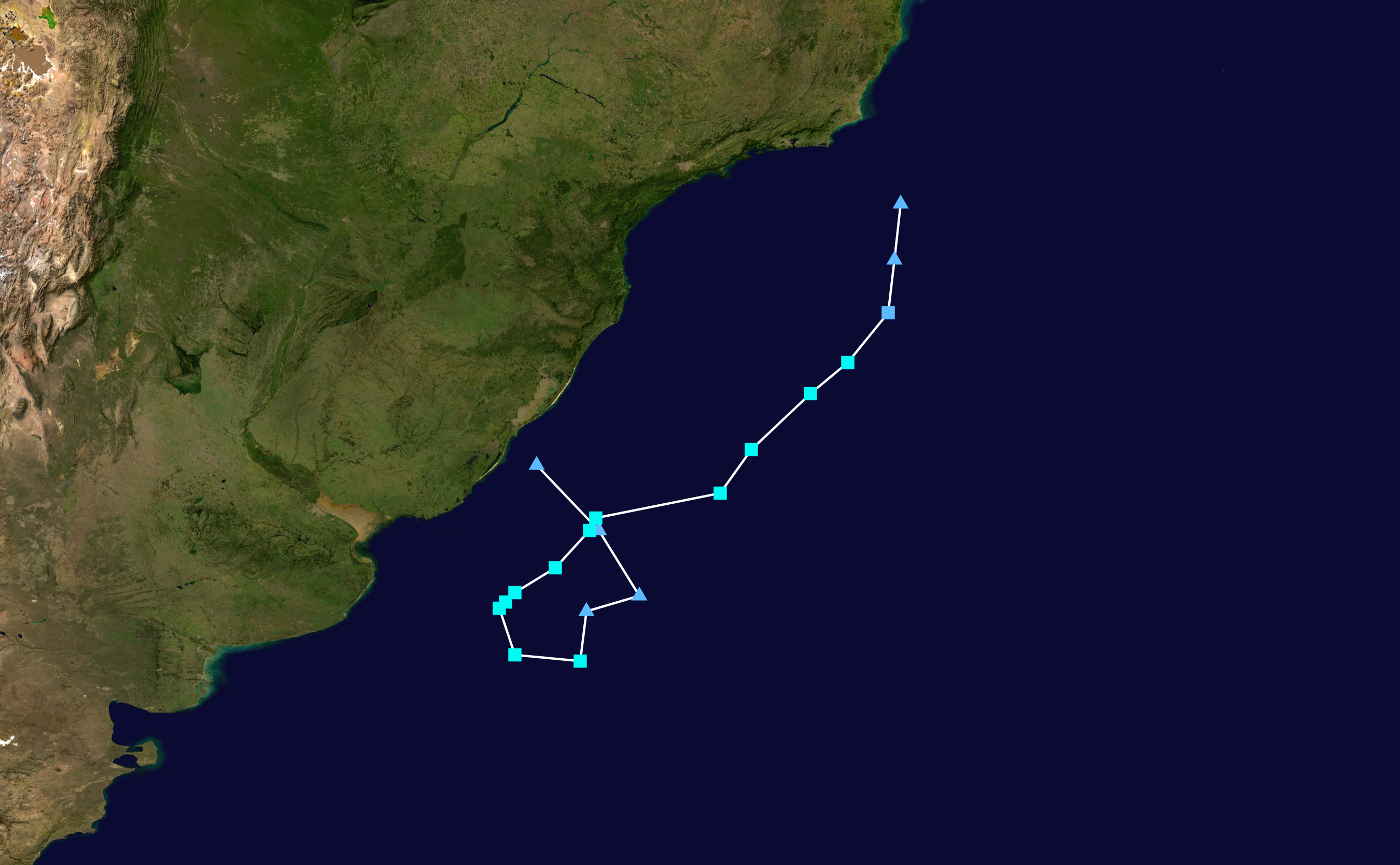
- Duration: 29 June 2021 – 1 July 2021
- Peak intensity: 85 km/h (50 mph) (1-min); 986 hPa (mbar)

An extratropical cyclone formed on 26 June 2021, about 520 km (320 mi) east-southeast of Montevideo, Uruguay, associated with a cold airmass that acted over the region. On the next day, the cyclone acquired a warm seclusion while intensifying, while it moved westwards and separated from the frontal system it was previously attached to. As the system occluded, the seclusion deepened and started to acquire subtropical characteristics, which led it to be designated as a subtropical storm on 29 June. It remained unnamed due to it being outside of the Brazilian Navy's area of responsibility. By 23:30 UTC on 28 June, the Satellite Products and Services Division of the NESDIS declared the system to have become a tropical storm, based on a Dvorak rating of 3.5, assigning an invest tag to it. Although being affected by strong wind shear to its north due to a subtropical jet caused by the presence of a frontal system nearby, it further intensified and achieved a minimum pressure 986 millibars (29.1 inHg), while tracking northeastwards towards the Brazilian area of authority. At around 12:00 UTC on the next day, as the storm entered the boundary of METAREA V, Brazilian Navy's area of responsibility, thus it was assigned the name Raoni. Continuing moving northeastwards, Raoni further developed an eye feature as well as a robust band to the east of the system. Raoni began to weaken by 30 June, as the subtropical jet broke the barotropic flow over it, and NESDIS dropped the tag as it lost its convective bands. On 1 July, Raoni lost its subtropical characteristics and degenerated into a low-pressure area.

The predecessor extratropical cyclone of Raoni caused heavy rains and strong winds gust up to 104 km/h (65 mph), downing trees and causing damages to different public and private establishments across Punta del Este. The area's waters were also rough due to the storm. Downpours with continuous gales were also experienced in Uruguay's capital Montevideo. From 24 June to 2 July, Raoni channeled cold air from Antarctica into portions of South America, leading to an unusually potent cold wave across Argentina, Uruguay, Paraguay, Bolivia, and Brazil, with the temperature dropping as much as 15 °C (27 °F) below average in some areas. The combination of the cyclone and the cold wave also produced snowfall across the southern portion of South America, with snowfall observed as far north as southern Brazil.

=== Subtropical Storm Ubá ===
- Subtropical storm (SSHWS)
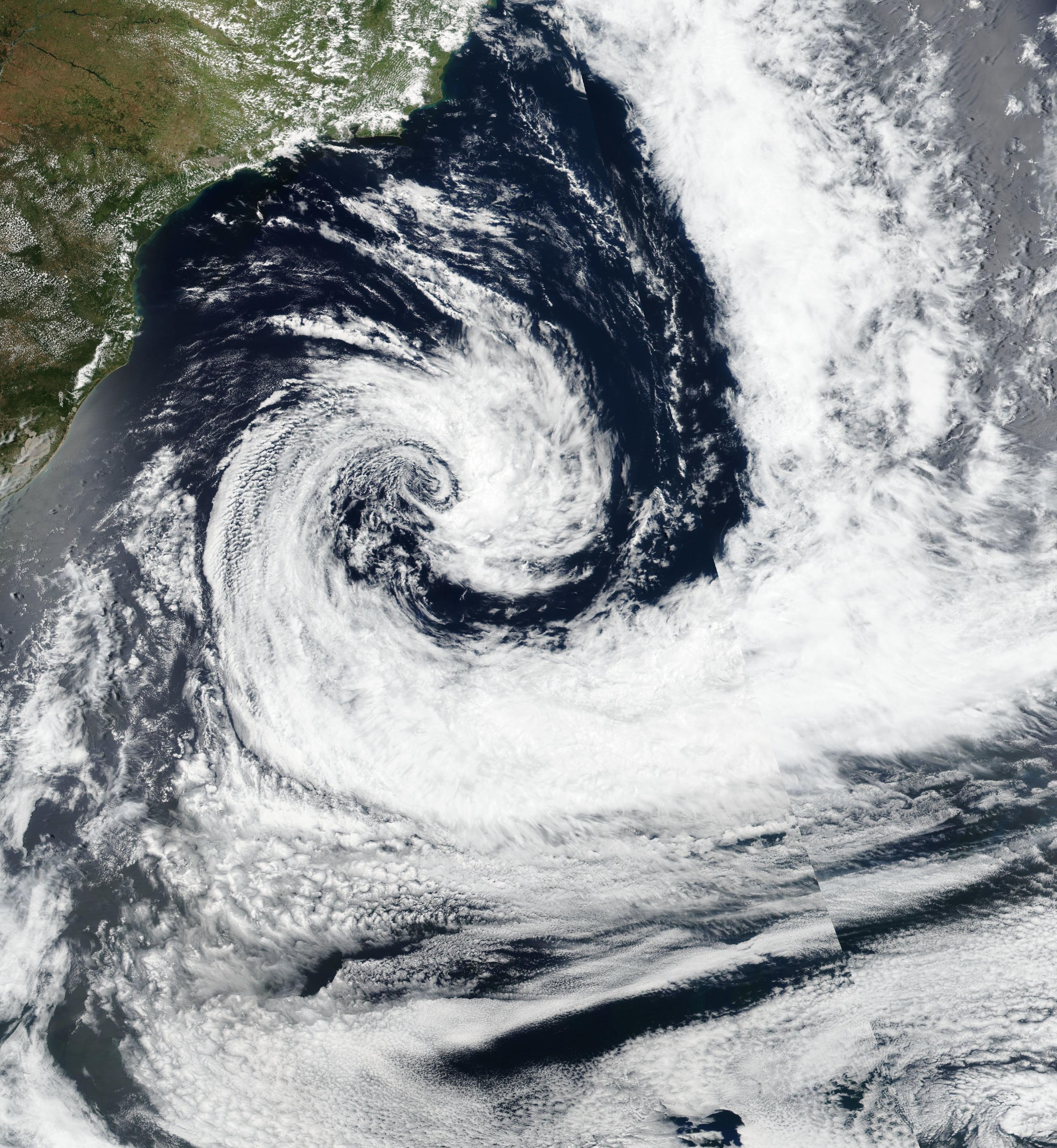
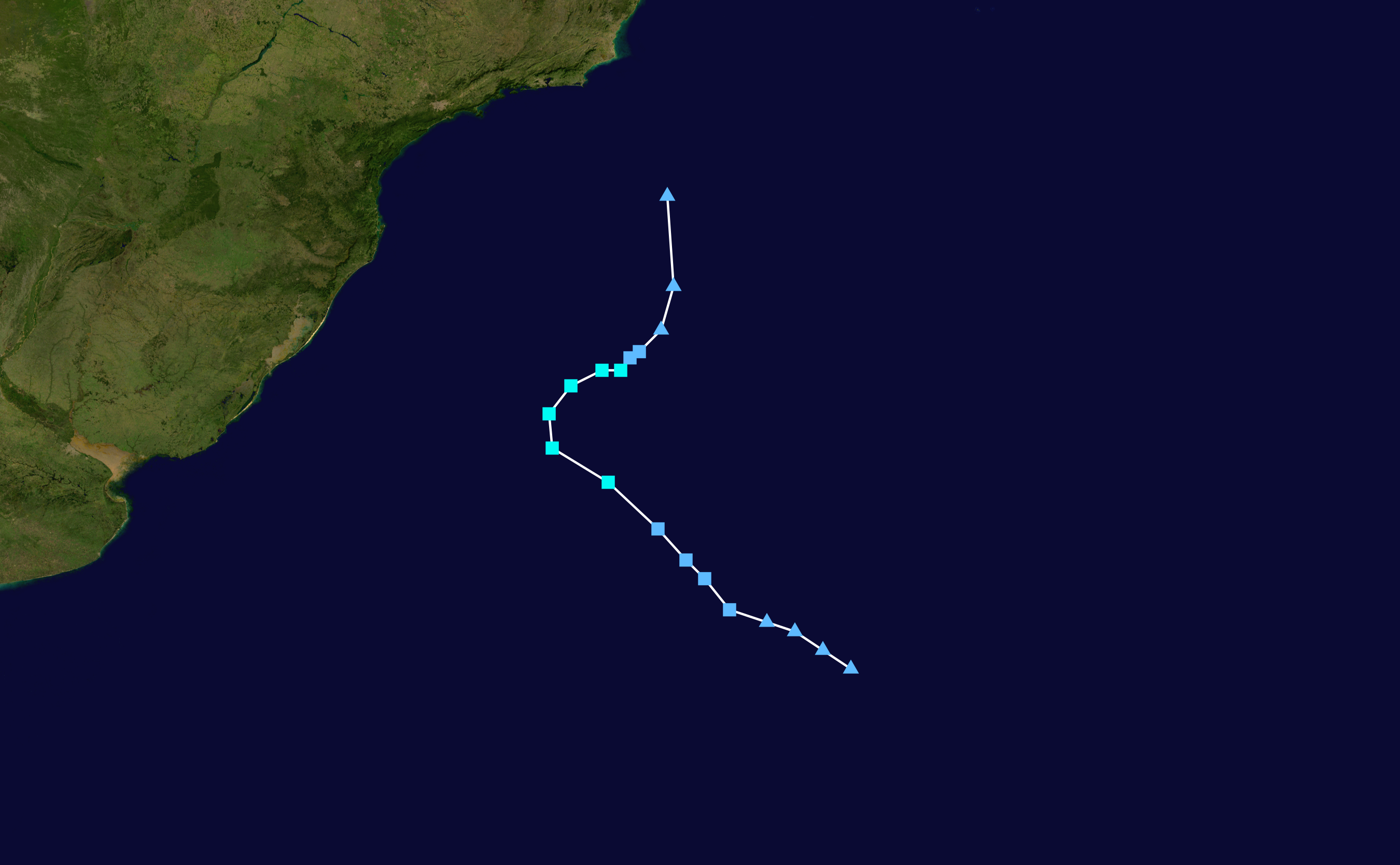
- Duration: 9 December 2021 – 12 December 2021
- Peak intensity: 65 km/h (40 mph) (1-min); 997 hPa (mbar)

On 9 December 2021, instability areas remained off the coast of Espírito Santo and Rio de Janeiro after the passage of a frontal system and a South Atlantic Convergence Zone. Overnight the system coalesced into an occluded front, which transitioned into a subtropical depression. On the morning of the next day, the system was upgraded to subtropical storm status, receiving the name Ubá. On 11 December Ubá gradually weakened while moving southeastwards, being downgraded to depression status. It degenerated into a remnant low-pressure area on the next day.

The precursor extratropical cyclone and South Atlantic Convergence Zone caused heavy rains in Minas Gerais, Espírito Santo and southern Bahia, where heavy precipitation accumulated 450 mm (18 in) in Itamaraju and 331 mm (13 in) in Monte Formoso, killing fifteen people.

=== Subtropical Storm Yakecan ===
- Subtropical storm (SSHWS)
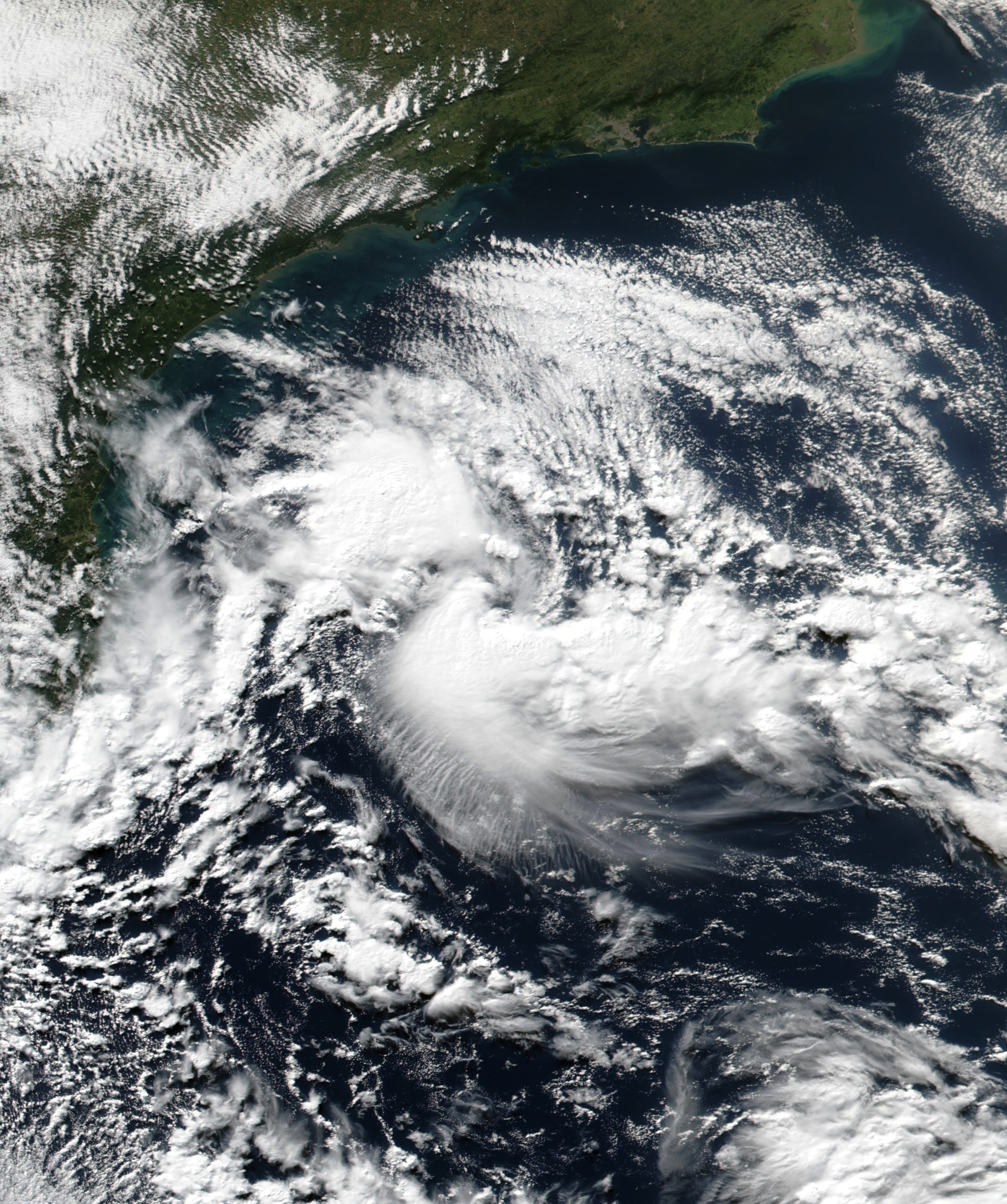
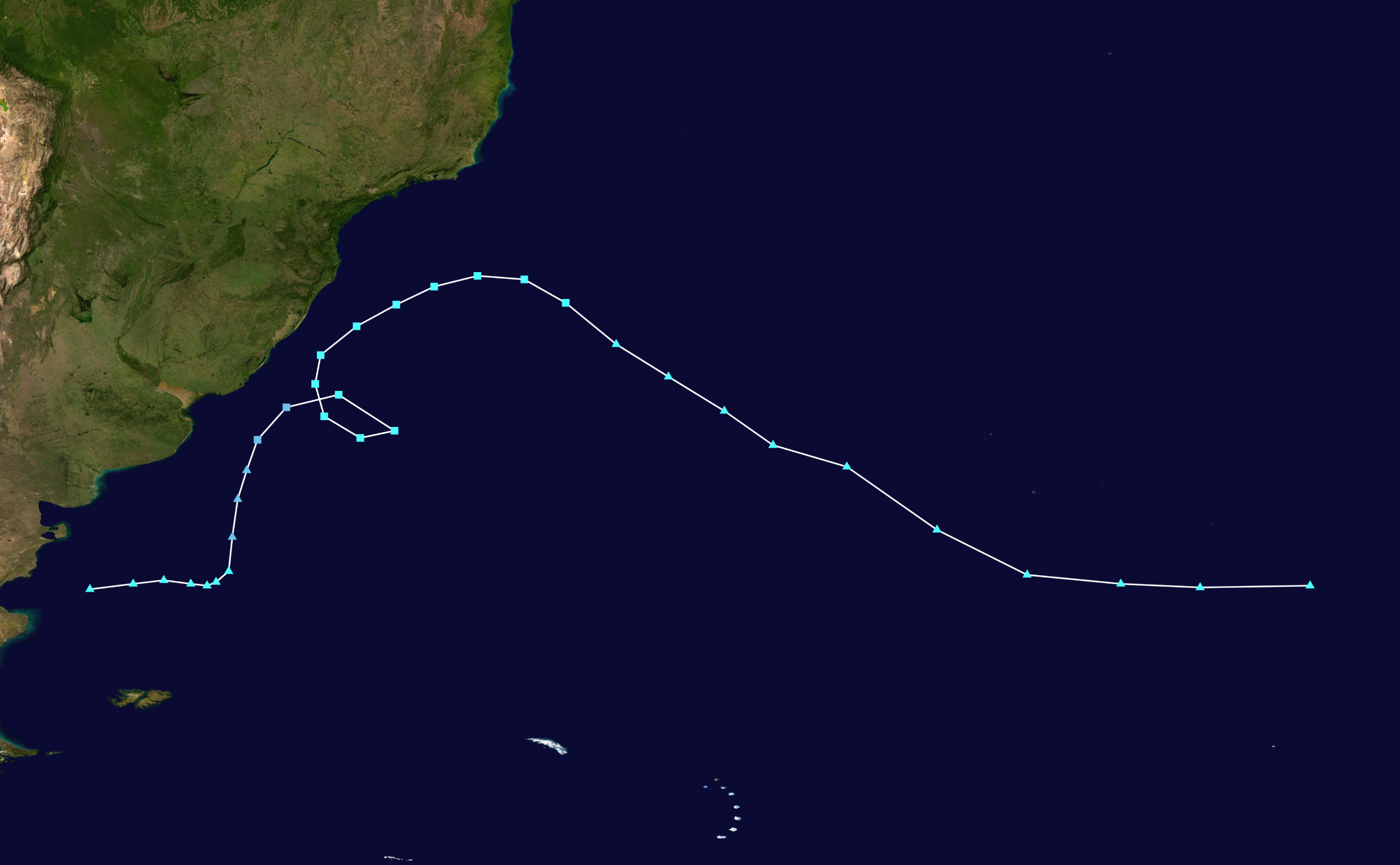
- Duration: 16 May 2022 – 19 May 2022
- Peak intensity: 95 km/h (60 mph) (1-min); 990 hPa (mbar)

On 15 May 2022, an extratropical cyclone moved through the southern region of Brazil and stopped offshore. The low occluded and separated form its precursor extratropical cyclone, obtaining subtropical characteristics in the process. On the morning of 17 May, the cyclone fully transitioned into a subtropical storm, and was given the name Yakecan. Taking a more northwestwardly movement, Yakecan moved away from the coastline, gradually losing its subtropical characteristics. On late 19 May, it acquired frontal characteristics and transitioned to an extratropical cyclone.

During its trajectory, the storm caused snow in the Gaúcha and Catarinense Mountains, setting record lows for this time of year. Two people died in Uruguay and Brazil due to the passage of the cyclone. Yakecan is the last name from the regular naming list, which has been in use since 2011.

=== Subtropical Depression #01-2023 ===
- Subtropical depression (SSHWS)
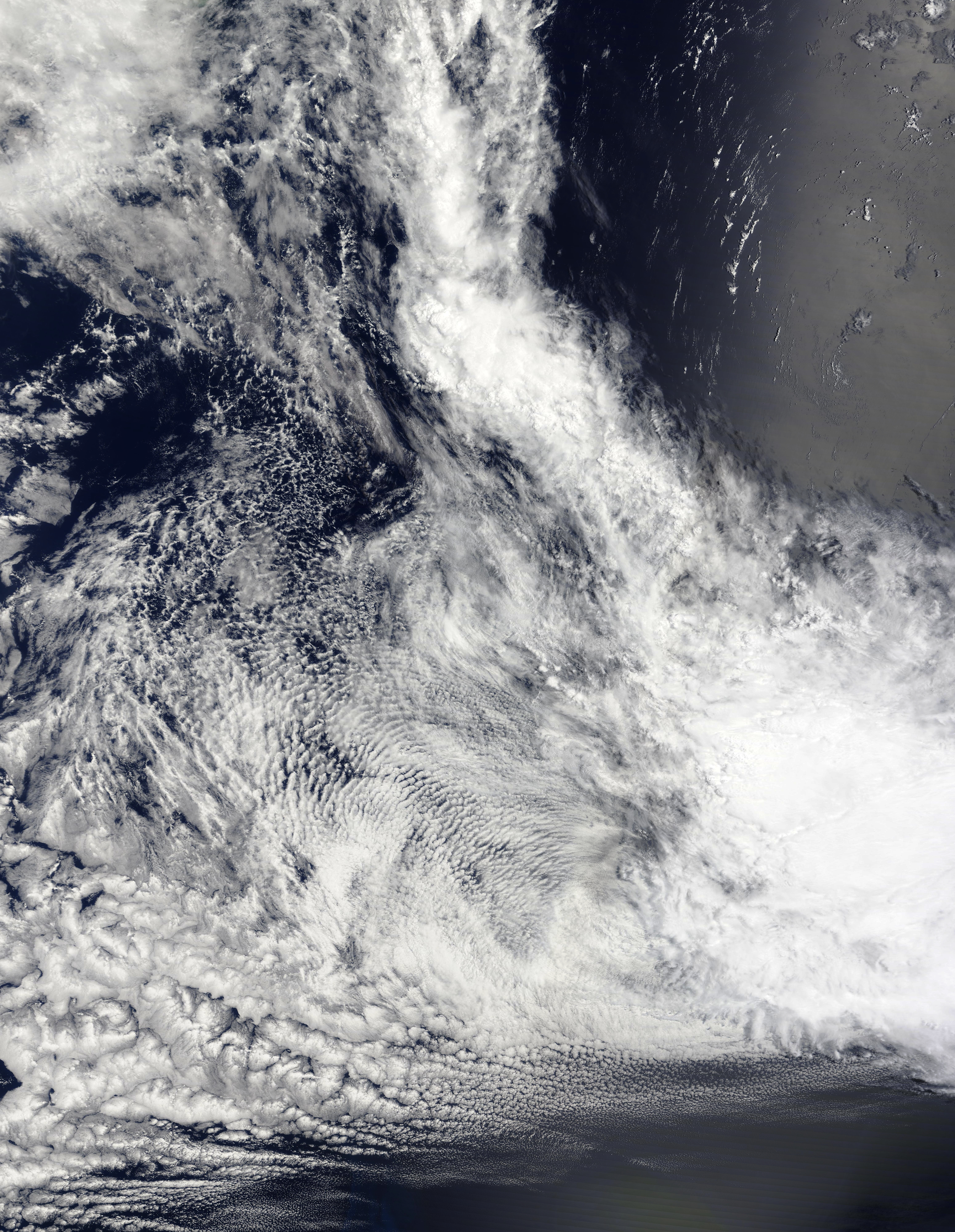
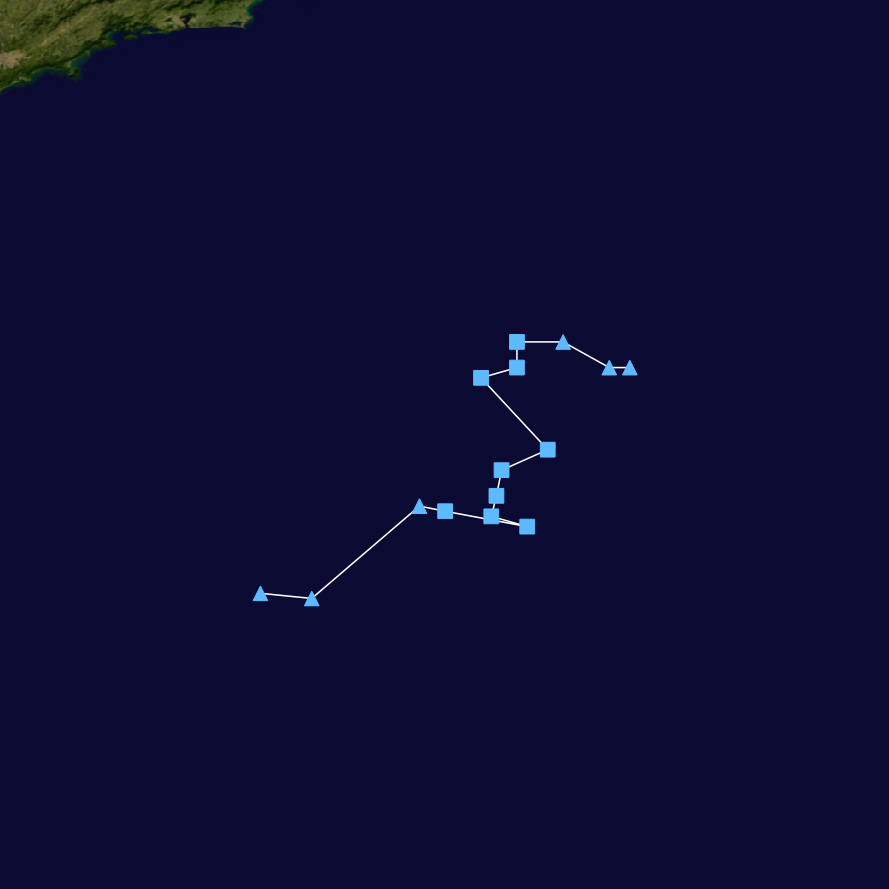
- Duration: 6 January 2023 – 9 January 2023
- Peak intensity: 55 km/h (35 mph) (1-min); 1010 hPa (mbar)

On late 6 January 2023, a subtropical depression formed from a quasi-stationary frontal system, about 528 nmi (978 km) east of the state of Santa Catarina. On the next day, the system achieved its lowest pressure of 1,010 millibars (30 inHg) as it moved southeastward, away from the frontal system while being enhanced by both anomaly high sea-surface temperatures and the presence of a South Atlantic Convergence Zone (SACZ) on the vicinity. On January 8 the system maintained the same direction, moving away from both the SACZ and the Brazilian coast, without affecting any area, gradually diminishing its convective activity. This process lasted until afternoon 10 January, as it opened into a trough, about 620 nmi (1,150 km) east of the state of Rio Grande do Sul.

=== Tropical Storm Akará ===
- Tropical storm (SSHWS)
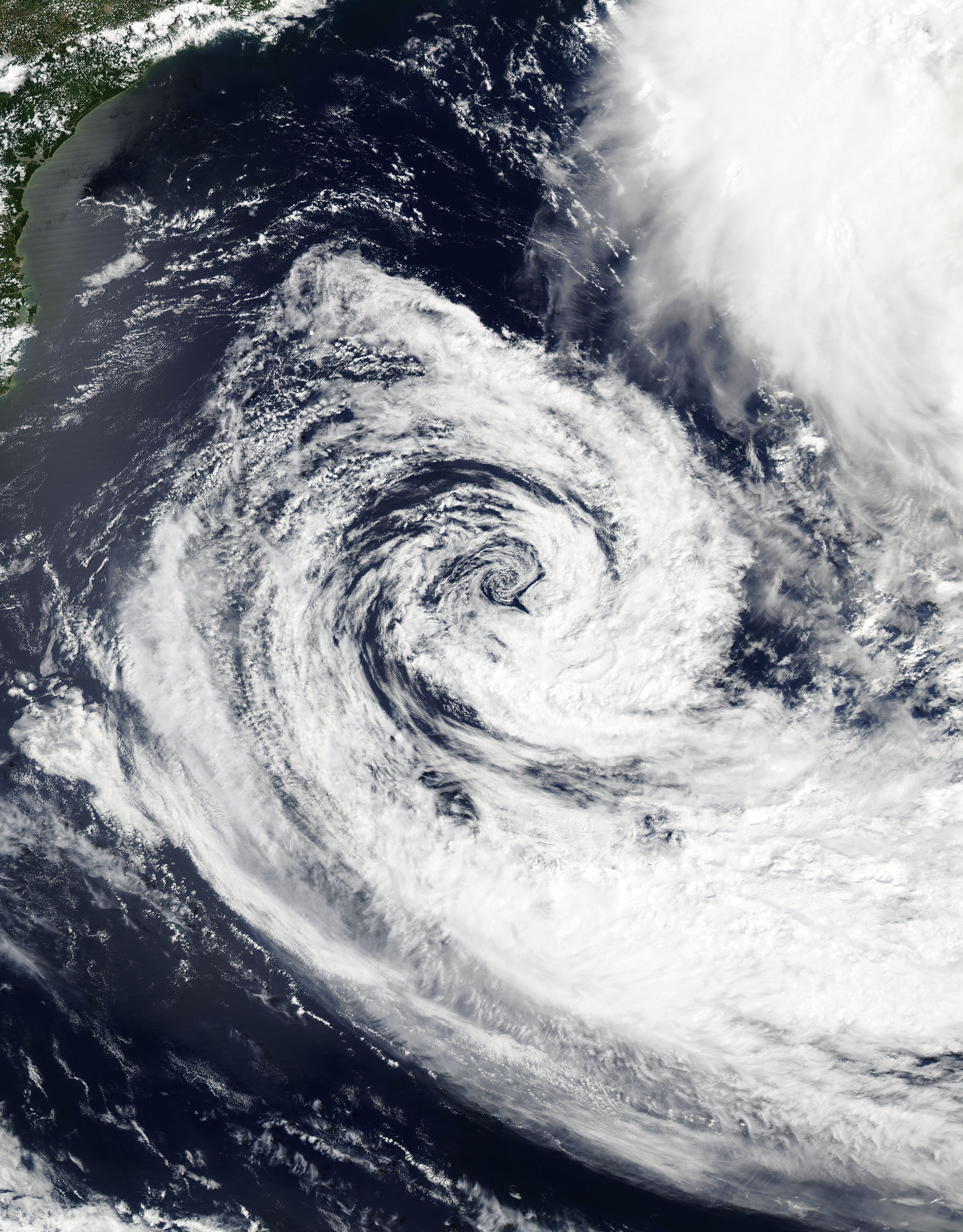
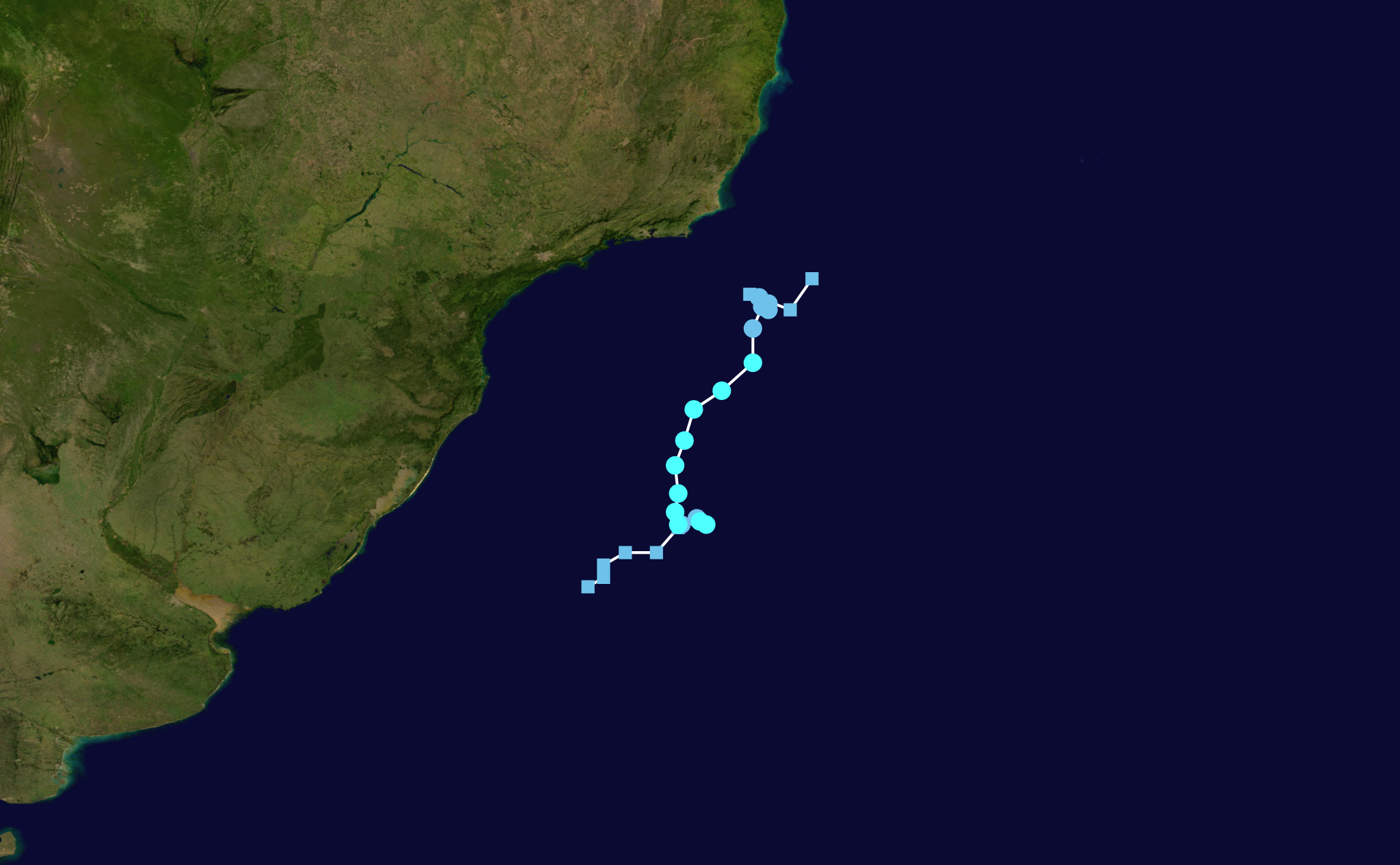
- Duration: 16 February 2024 – 22 February 2024
- Peak intensity: 85 km/h (50 mph) (1-min); 994 hPa (mbar)

In February 2024, a low-pressure area began developing along a stalled cold front. Moisture from the tropics began feeding into the circulation of the developing disturbance, helping it to intensify. On 16 February 2024, the Brazilian Navy designated the system, which at the time was east southeast of Rio de Janeiro, Brazil, as a subtropical depression. Two days later, the system transitioned into a tropical cyclone. Early on 19 February, the system intensified into a tropical storm, receiving the name Akará from the Brazilian Navy. However, two days later, the system lost its tropical characteristics and weakened into a subtropical depression. The next day, the system lost its subtropical characteristics, thus the Brazilian Navy ceased all bulletins.

The precursor extratropical cyclone to Akará brought heavy rainfall to South America. Nova Iguaçu was affected with intense rainfall and winds. Akará was the first named tropical storm to develop in the basin since Iba in 2019.

=== Subtropical Storm Biguá ===
- Subtropical storm (SSHWS)
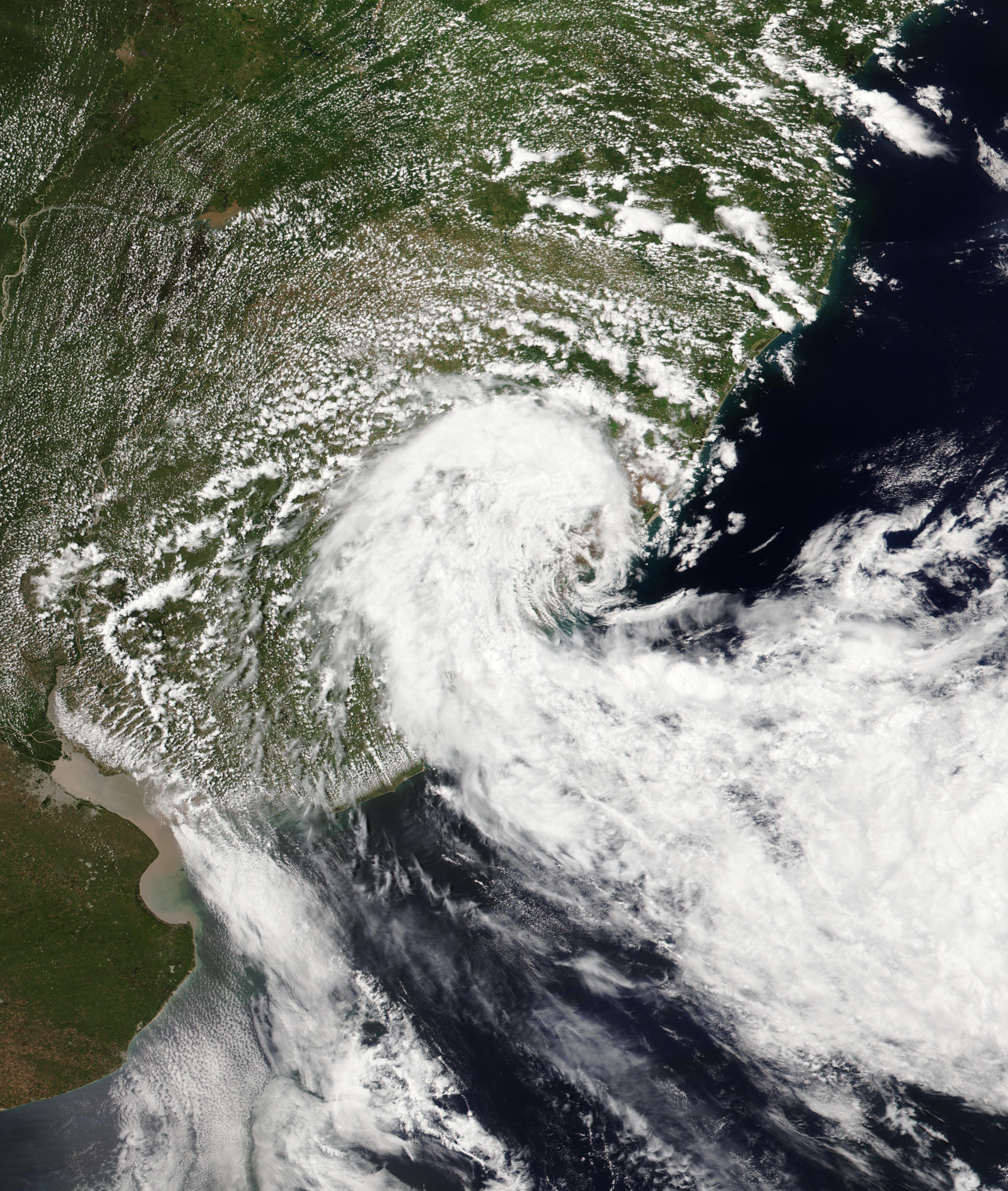
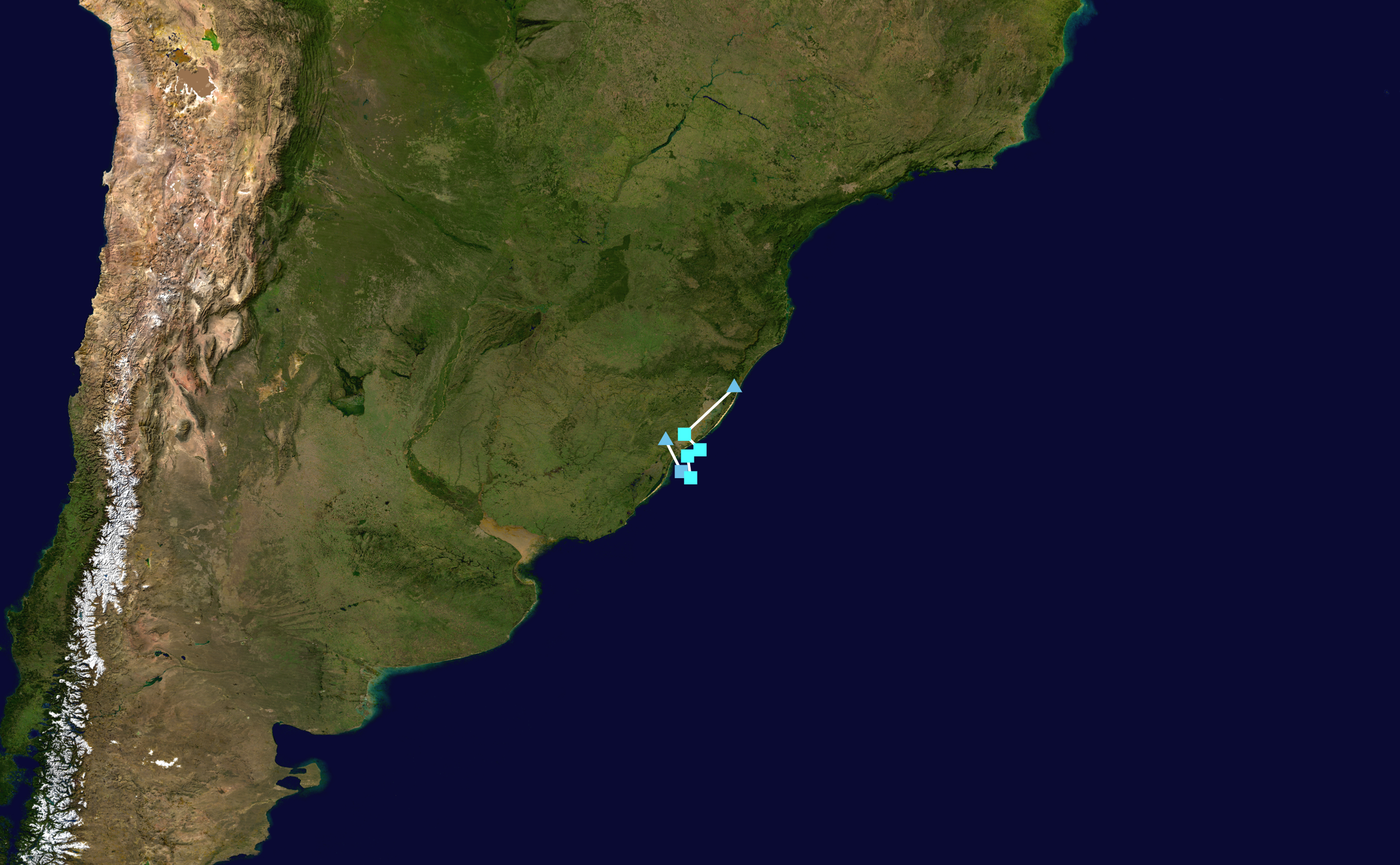
- Duration: 14 December 2024 – 16 December 2024
- Peak intensity: 95 km/h (60 mph) (1-min); 998 hPa (mbar)

Early on 15 December 2024, a subtropical storm formed off the coast of the Brazil–Uruguay border, receiving the name Biguá from the Brazilian Navy. As it moved southeastwards, away from the coastline, the system was downgraded to subtropical depression. On early 17 December 2024, the cyclone was downgraded to a low-pressure area as it transitioned to a extratropical cyclone.

The closeness to the Brazilian shore caused wind gusts over the southeastern Rio Grande do Sul, leading to power losses and structural damages on nearby cities, the CEEE marked severe impacts and 230,000 buildings were left without power. On 17 December, the remnants of Biguá and another low pressure system spawned a tornado in the municipality of Vale Verde, Rio Grande do Sul. The tornado was estimated to be of F0-F1 intensity, although it did not cause any reports of damage.

=== Subtropical Storm Caiobá ===
- Subtropical storm (SSHWS)
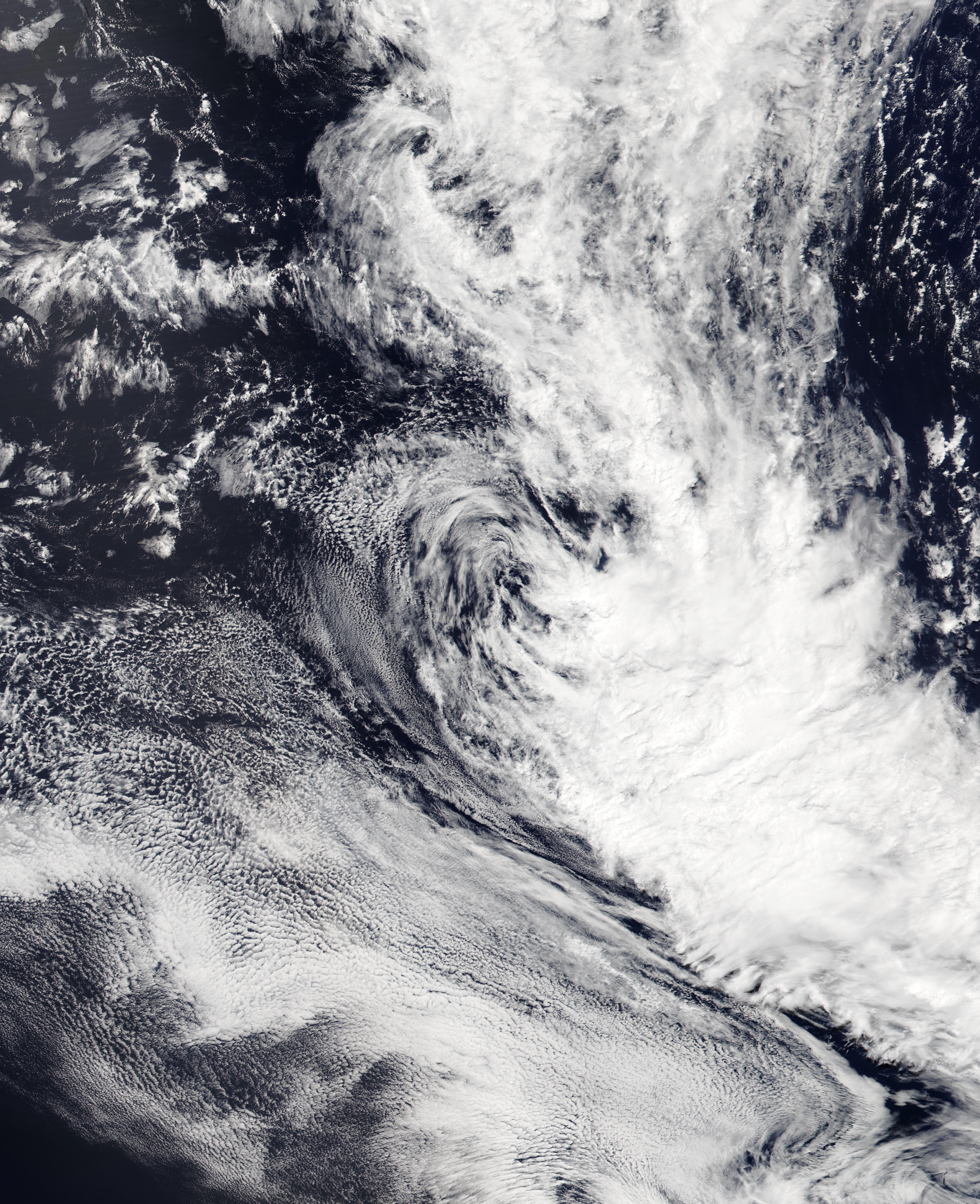
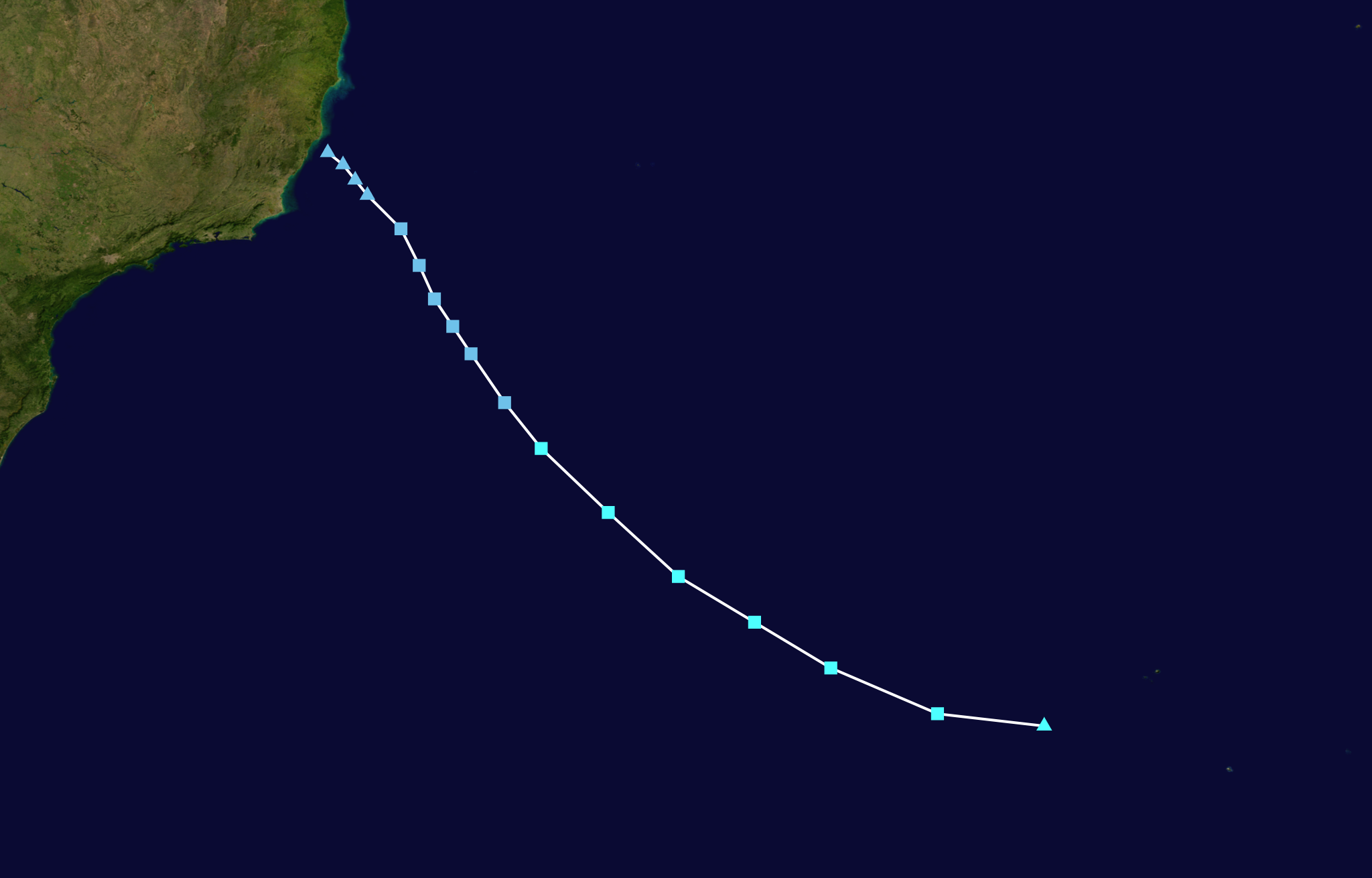
- Duration: 2 March 2026 – 3 March 2026
- Peak intensity: 75 km/h (45 mph) (1-min); 1003 hPa (mbar)

On 2 March 2026, a subtropical depression formed just north of an already existing one, marking the first time in recorded history that two cyclones, either tropical or subtropical, have existed simultaneously in the South Atlantic. Later that day, the system strengthened into a subtropical storm and was named Caiobá. As it moved generally southeastwards, away from South America, it was last noted on late 3 March.

=== Other systems (2020s) ===
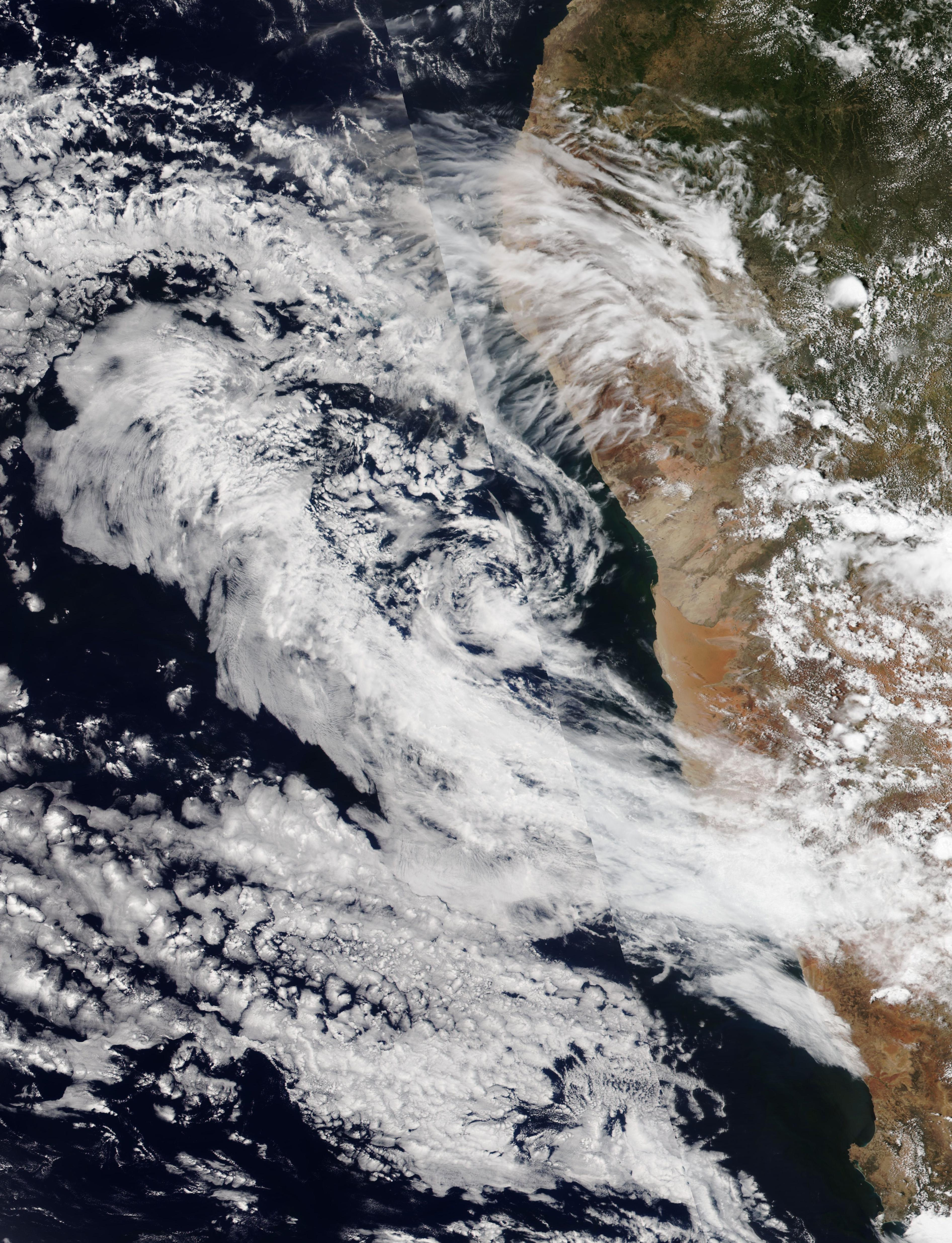
Cyclone Chalane as a remnant low in the Southeastern Atlantic on 3 January, 2021

- On 3 January 2021, according to Météo-France, the remnants of Tropical Storm Chalane from the South-West Indian Ocean crossed southern Africa and briefly emerged into the eastern South Atlantic before dissipating.
- On 23 March, 2024, according to the European Centre for Medium-Range Weather Forecasts (ECMWF) re-analysis product (ERA5), a subtropical storm formed southwest of South Africa, given the ID "SA2024-00213". The system drifted northward until the following day, where it dissipated.

A tropical storm, unofficially dubbed "Revegoca" south of Brazil on 12 December, 2025

- On 9 December 2025, according to a paper published in the Journal of Geophysical Research: Atmospheres, an "atypical synoptic cyclone" formed near the Triple Frontier, and developed into a subtropical cyclone the following day, with its pressure falling 13 mb (0.38 inHg) in 12 hours. Later that day, the cyclone acquired full tropical characteristics, reaching its peak intensity of 50 mph (80 km/h) and a minimum pressure of 978 mb (28.9 inHg). The system became post-tropical on 12 December, which lasted until 23 December near the coast of Antarctica. The authors gave the storm the unofficial name "Revegoca", an acronym derived from their names, and they associated it to a large-scale windstorm that killed one person and caused damages in São Paulo, estimated to be over R$1.54 billion (US$259.5 million), leaving over 2 million without power and more than 400 flights cancelled.
- On 28 February 2026, shortly before Caiobá's formation, a subtropical depression formed along the coastline of the State of Rio De Janeiro and Espírito Santo, and they coexisted between March 1 and 3 until the depression dissipated over open waters.
- On 30 March 2026, Metsul Meteorologia noted that an extratropical cyclone had double atypical behaviour, that it was shifting east to west and having a symmetric warm core, noting it would transition into a subtropical cyclone. The next day, Metsul considered it a subtropical cyclone, noting it would give strong winds to the coast of Rio Grande do Sul, later, it dissipated on April 1.

== Climatological statistics ==
There have been 88 recorded tropical and subtropical cyclones in the South Atlantic Ocean since 1957. Like most southern hemisphere cyclone seasons, most of the storms have formed between November and May.

List of storms, by month

Month	Number of recorded storms in the South Atlantic Ocean
January	11
February	10
March	13
April	7
May	11
June	7
July	5
August	5
September	5
October	2
November	9
December	9

List of storms, by decade

Decade	Number of recorded storms in the South Atlantic Ocean
1950s	7
1960s	13
1970s	13
1980s	3
1990s	9
2000s	19
2010s	15
2020s	17

== See also ==
- Unusual areas of tropical cyclone formation
- List of South America hurricanes
- List of Mediterranean tropical-like cyclones
