= List of Mediterranean tropical-like cyclones =

List of weather events

Summary map of most recognized Mediterranean tropical-like cyclones from 1969–2026

This article documents all Mediterranean tropical-like cyclones, or medicanes, that have been recorded, alongside all documented tropical-like cyclones that have formed in the Black Sea. The occurrence of medicanes has been described as not particularly rare.

== Summary ==
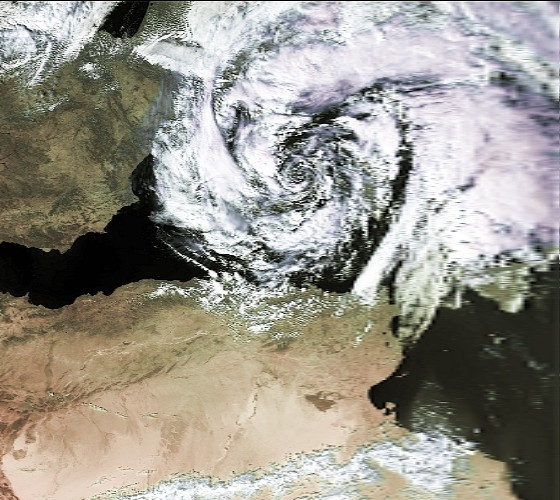
Visible satellite imagery of a "medicane" above the Balearic Islands on 7 October 1996

A majority of Mediterranean tropical cyclones (tropical cyclogenesis) form over two separate regions. The first, more conducive for development than the other, encompasses an area of the western Mediterranean bordered by the Balearic Islands, southern France, and the shorelines of the islands of Corsica and Sardinia. The second identified region of development, in the Ionian Sea between Sicily and Greece and stretching south to Libya, is less favorable for tropical cyclogenesis. An additional two regions, in the Aegean and Adriatic seas, produce fewer medicanes, while activity is minimal in the Levantine region. The geographical distribution of Mediterranean tropical-like cyclones is markedly different from that of other cyclones, with the formation of regular cyclones centering on the Pyrenees and Atlas mountain ranges, the Gulf of Genoa, and in the Ionian Sea. Although meteorological factors are most advantageous in the Adriatic and Aegean seas, the closed nature of the region's geography, bordered by land, allows little time for further evolution.

The geography of mountain ranges bordering the Mediterranean are conducive for severe weather and thunderstorms, with the sloped nature of mountainous regions permitting the development of convective activity. Although the geography of the Mediterranean region, as well as its dry air, typically prevent the formation of tropical cyclones, when certain meteorological circumstances arise, difficulties influenced by the region's geography are overcome. The occurrence of tropical cyclones in the Mediterranean Sea is generally extremely rare, with an average of 1.57 forming annually and merely 99 recorded occurrences of tropical-like storms discovered between 1948 and 2011 in a modern study, with no definitive trend in activity in that period. Few medicanes form during the summer season, though activity typically rises in autumn, peaks in January, and gradually decreases from February to May. In the western Mediterranean region of development, approximately 0.75 such systems form each year, compared with 0.32 in the Ionian Sea region. However, on very rare occasions, similar tropical-like storms may also develop in the Black Sea.

Studies have evaluated that global warming can result in higher observed intensities of tropical cyclones as a result of deviations in the surface energy flux and atmospheric composition, which both heavily influence the development of medicanes as well. In tropical and subtropical areas, sea surface temperatures (SSTs) rose 0.2 °C (0.36 °F) within a 50-year period, and in the North Atlantic and Northwestern Pacific tropical cyclone basins, the potential destructiveness and energy of storms nearly doubled within the same duration, evidencing a clear correlation between global warming and tropical cyclone intensities. Within a similarly recent 20-year period, SSTs in the Mediterranean Sea increased by 0.6 to 1 °C (1.1 to 1.8 °F), though no observable increase in medicane activity has been noted, as of 2013. In 2006, a computer-driven atmospheric model evaluated the future frequency of Mediterranean cyclones between 2071 and 2100, projecting a decrease in autumn, winter, and spring cyclonic activity coinciding with a dramatic increase in formation near Cyprus, with both scenarios attributed to elevated temperatures as a result of global warming. In another study, researchers found that more tropical-like storms in the Mediterranean could reach Category 1 strength by the end of the 21st century, with most of the stronger storms appearing in the autumn, though the models indicated that some storms could potentially reach Category 2 intensity. Other studies, however, have been inconclusive, forecasting both increases and decreases in duration, number, and intensity. Three independent studies, using different methodologies and data, evaluated that while medicane activity would likely decline with a rate depending on the climate scenario considered, a higher percentage of those that formed would be of greater strength.

== Pre-2000 ==
=== 1969 medicane (Caecilia) ===
- Tropical storm (SSHWS)
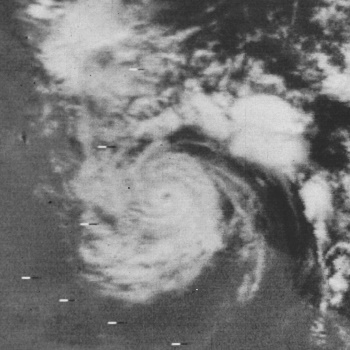
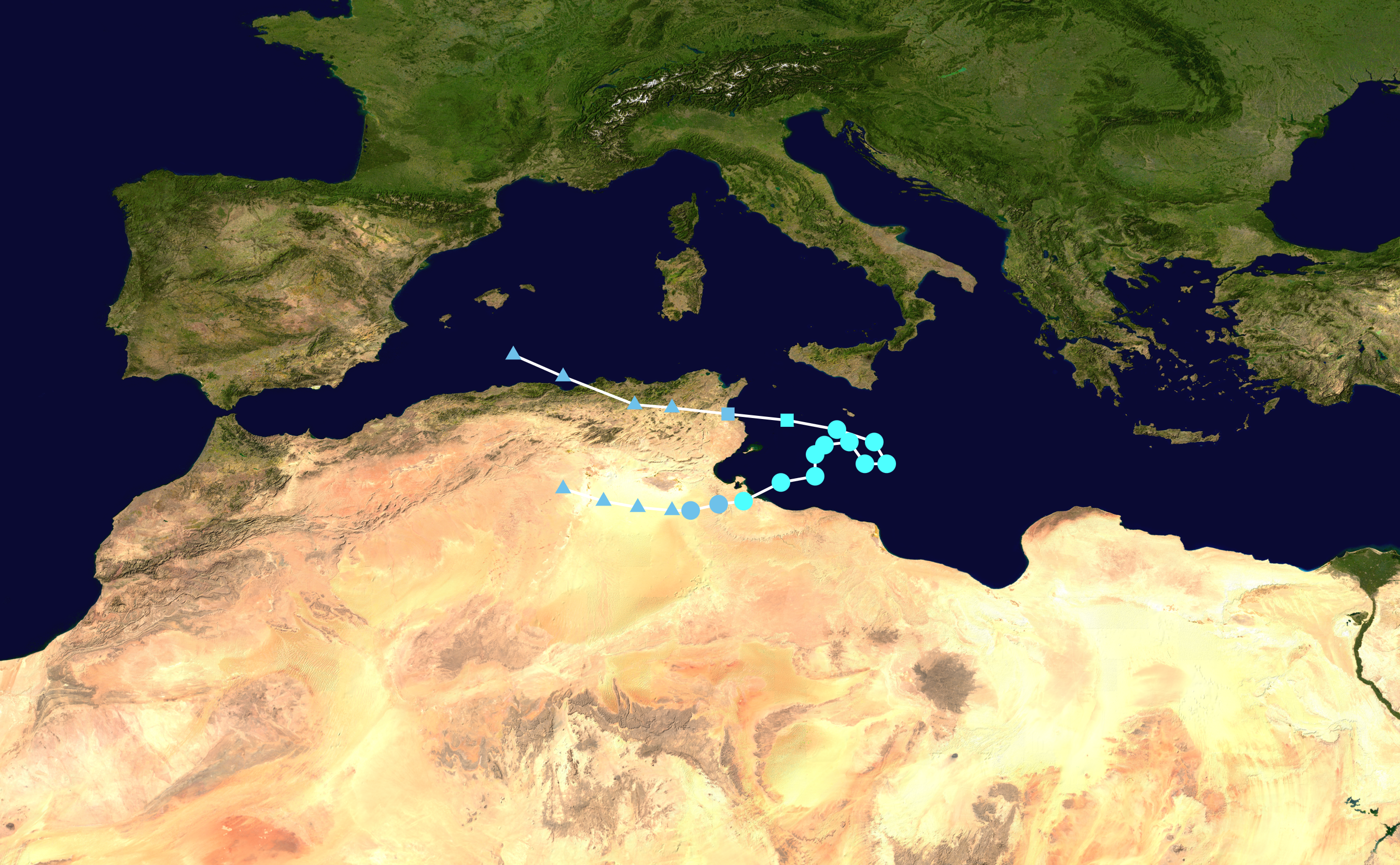
- Duration: 22 September 1969 – 27 September 1969
- Peak intensity: 110 km/h (70 mph) (1-min); 988 hPa (mbar)

An unusually severe Mediterranean tropical cyclone developed on 23 September 1969 southeast of Malta, producing severe flooding. Steep pressure and temperature gradients above the Atlas mountain range were evident on 19 September, a result of cool sea air attempting to penetrate inland; south of the mountains, a lee depression—a low-pressure area in a mountainous region—developed. Under the influence of mountainous terrain, the low initially meandered northeastward. Following the entry of cool sea air, however, it recurved to the southeast before transitioning into a Saharan depression associated with a distinct cold front by 22 September. Along the front's path, desert air moved northward while cold air drifted in the opposite direction, and in northern Libya, warm arid air clashed with the cooler levant of the Mediterranean. The organization of the disturbance improved slightly further before emerging into the Mediterranean Sea on 23 September, upon which the system experienced immediate cyclogenesis, rapidly intensifying while southeast of Malta as a cold-core cut-off low, and acquiring tropical characteristics. In western Africa, meanwhile, several disturbances converged toward Mauritania and Algeria, while the medicane recurved southwestward back toward the coast, losing its closed circulation and later dissipating.

The cyclone produced severe flooding throughout regions of northern Africa. Malta received upward of 123 mm (4.8 in) of rainfall on 23 September, Sfax measured 45 mm (1.8 in) on 24 September, Tizi Ouzou collected 55 mm (2.2 in) on 25 September, Gafsa received 79 mm (3.1 in) and Constantine measured 46 mm (1.8 in) on 26 September, Cap Bengut collected 43 mm (1.7 in) on 27 September, and Biskra received 122 mm (4.8 in) on 28 September. In Malta, a 20000-ton tanker struck a reef and split in two, while in Gafsa, Tunisia, the cyclone flooded phosphate mines, leaving over 25,000 miners unemployed and costing the government over £2 million per week. Thousands of camels and snakes, drowned by flood waters, were swept out to sea, and massive Roman bridges, which withstood all floods since the fall of the Roman Empire, collapsed. In all, the floods in Tunisia and Algeria killed almost 600 individuals, left 250,000 homeless, and severely damaged regional economies. Due to communication problems, however, flood relief funds and television appeals were not set up until nearly a month later. This became the second deadliest Mediterranean tropical cyclone on record.

=== 1982 medicane (Leucosia) ===
- Tropical storm (SSHWS)
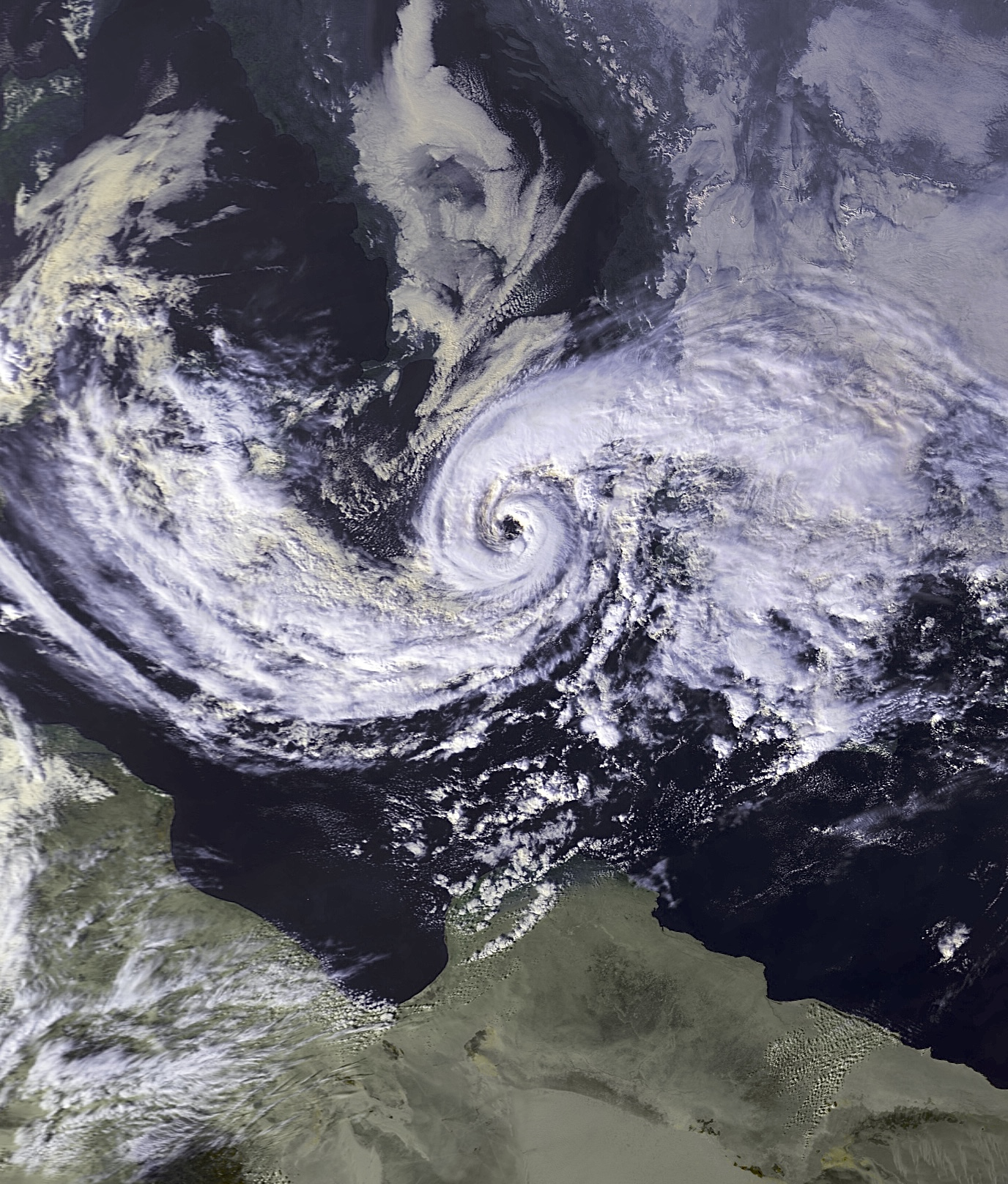
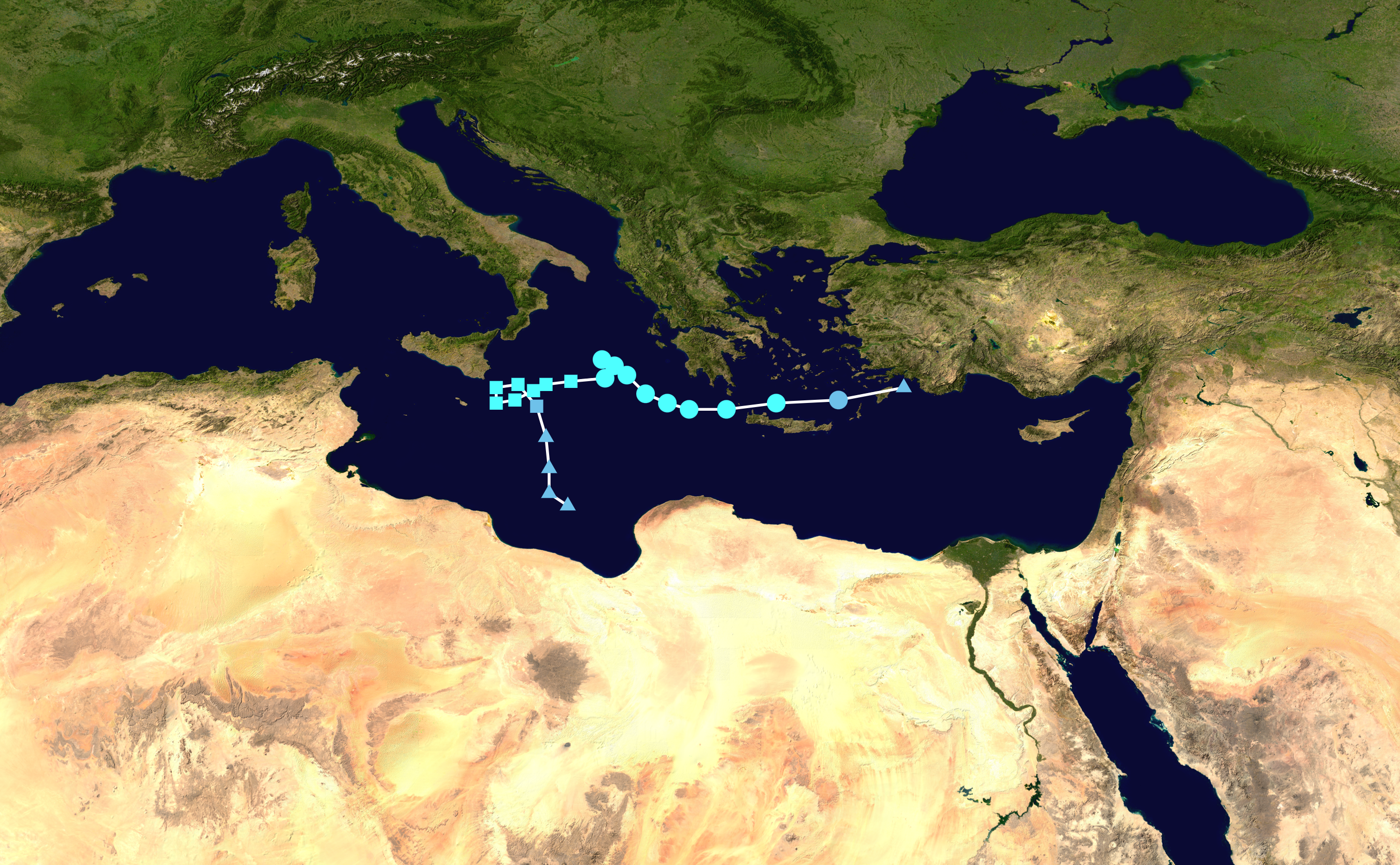
- Duration: 24 January 1982 – 27 January 1982
- Peak intensity: 110 km/h (70 mph) (1-min); 992 hPa (mbar)

The unusual Mediterranean tropical storm of January 1982, dubbed Leucosia, was first detected in waters north of Libya. The storm likely reached the Atlas mountain range as a low-pressure area by 23 January 1982, reinforced by an elongated, slowly-drifting trough above the Iberian Peninsula. Eventually, a closed circulation center developed by 1310 UTC, over parts of the Mediterranean with sea surface temperatures (SSTs) of approximately 16 °C (61 °F) and air temperature of 12 °C (54 °F). A hook-shaped cloud developed within the system shortly thereafter, rotating as it elongated into a 150 km (93 mi)-long comma-shaped apparatus. After looping around Sicily, it drifted eastward between the island and Peloponnese, recurving on its track again, exhibiting clearly curved spiral banding before shrinking slightly. The cyclone reached its peak intensity at 1800 UTC on the following day, maintaining an atmospheric pressure of 992 mbar (29.3 inHg), and was succeeded by a period of gradual weakening, with the system's pressure eventually rising to 1,009 mbar (29.8 inHg). The system slightly reintensified, however, for a six-hour period on 26 January. Ship reports indicated winds of 93 km/h (58 mph; 50 kn) were present in the cyclone at the time, tropical storm-force winds on the Saffir–Simpson hurricane wind scale, likely near the eyewall of the cyclone, which features the highest winds in a tropical cyclone.

The Global Weather Center's Cyclone Weather Center of the United States Air Force (USAF) initiated "Mediterranean Cyclone Advisories" on the cyclone at six-hour intervals starting at 1800 UTC on 27 January, until 0600 UTC on the following day. Convection was most intense in the eastern sector of the cyclone as it drifted east-northeastward. On infrared satellite imagery, the eye itself was 58.5 km (36.4 mi) in diameter, contracting to just 28 kilometres (17 mi) one day prior to making landfall. The cyclone passed by Malta, Italy, and Greece before dissipating several days later, in the extreme eastern Mediterranean. Observations related to the cyclone, however, were inadequate, and although the system maintained numerous tropical characteristics, it is possible it was merely a compact but powerful extratropical cyclone exhibiting a clear eye, spiral banding, towering cumulonimbi, and high surface winds along the eyewall.

=== 1983 medicane ===
- Unknown-strength storm
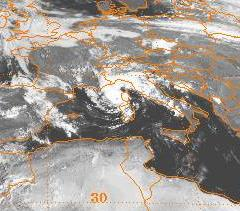
- Duration: 27 September 1983 – 2 October 1983
- Peak intensity: 90 km/h (55 mph) (1-min);

On 27 September 1983, a medicane was observed at sea between Tunisia and Sicily, looping around Sardinia and Corsica, coming ashore twice on the islands, before making landfall at Tunis early on 2 October and dissipating. The development of the system was not encouraged by baroclinic instability; rather, convection was incited by abnormally high sea surface temperatures (SSTs) at the time of its formation. It also featured a definitive eye, tall cumulonimbus clouds, intense sustained winds, and a warm core. For most of its duration, it maintained a diameter of 200 to 300 km (120 to 190 mi), though it shrank just before landfall on Ajaccio to a diameter of 100 km (62 mi).

=== 1984 medicane ===
- Unknown-strength storm
- Duration: 29 December 1984 – 30 December 1984

On 29 December 1984, a cyclone near Tunisia became a well-defined medicane with an eye-like feature. It dissipated on 30 December.

=== 1995 medicane (Celeno) ===
- Category 1 tropical cyclone (SSHWS)
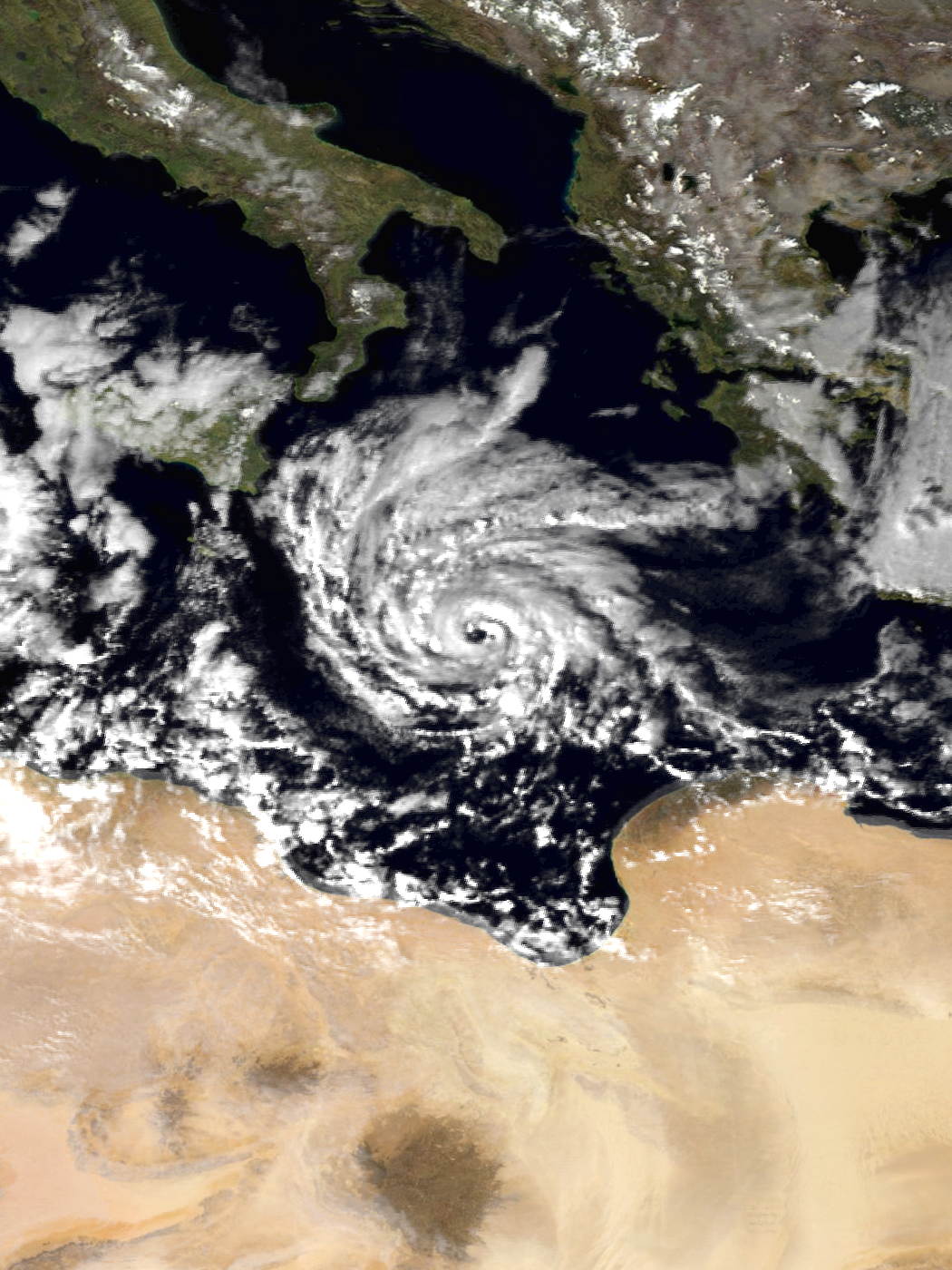
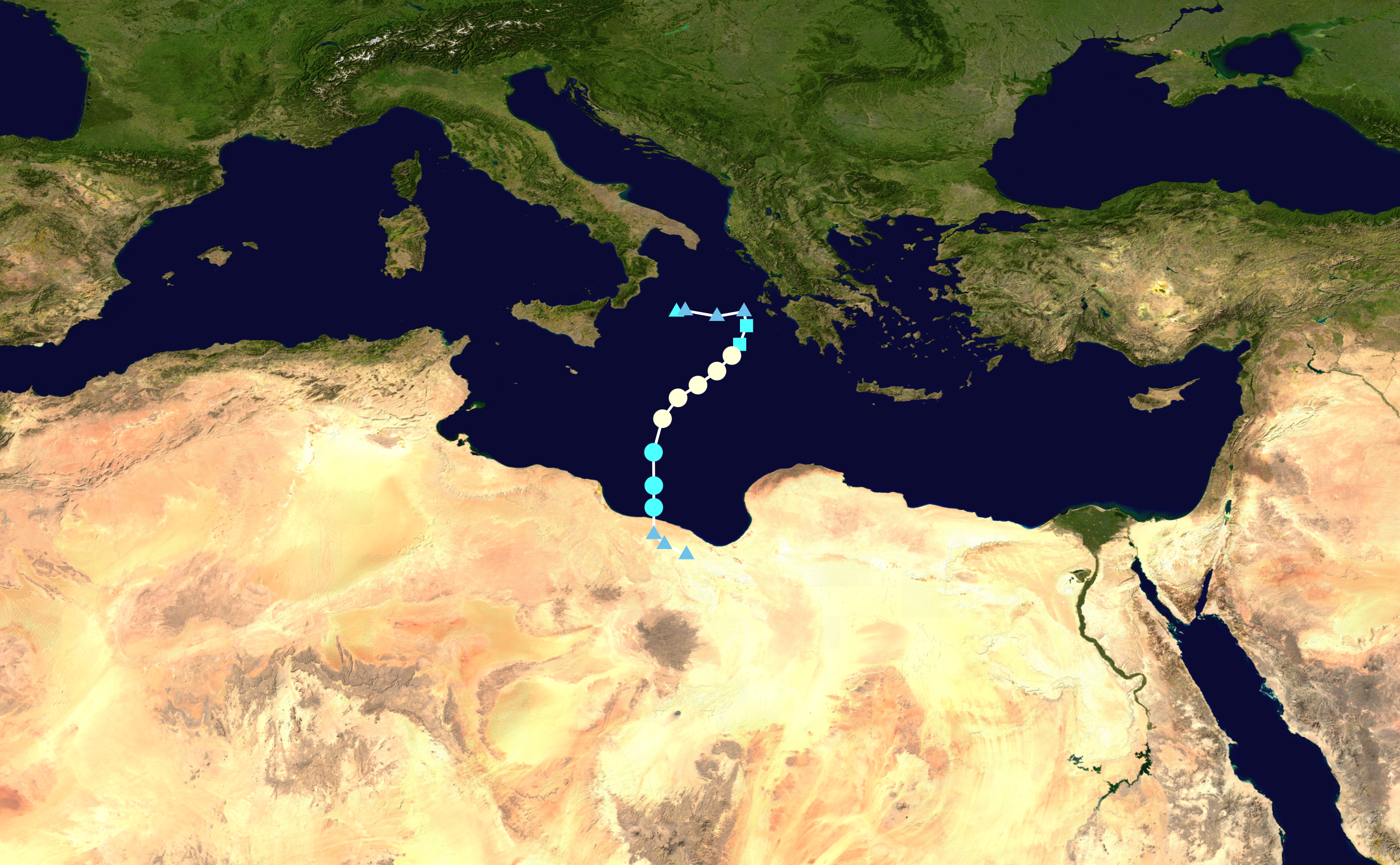
- Duration: 15 January 1995 – 17 January 1995
- Peak intensity: 140 km/h (85 mph) (1-min); 975 hPa (mbar)

Among numerous documented medicanes, the cyclone of January 1995, which was dubbed Celeno, is generally considered to be the best-documented instance in the 20th century. The storm emerged from the Libyan coast and moved toward the Ionian shoreline of Greece on 13 January as a compact low-pressure area. The medicane maintained winds reaching up to 108 km/h (67 mph; 58 kn) as it traversed the Ionian Sea, while the German research ship Meteor recorded winds of 135 km/h (84 mph; 73 kn). Upon the low's approach near Greece, it began to envelop an area of atmospheric convection; meanwhile, in the middle troposphere, a trough extended from Russia to the Mediterranean, bringing with it extremely cold temperatures. Two low-pressure areas were present along the path of the trough, with one situated above Ukraine and the other above the central Mediterranean, likely associated with a low-level cyclone over western Greece. Upon weakening and dissipation on 14 January, a second low, the system which would evolve into the Mediterranean tropical cyclone, developed in its place on 15 January.

At the time of formation, high clouds indicated the presence of intense convection, and the cyclone featured an axisymmetric cloud structure, with a distinct, cloud-free eye and rainbands spiraling around the disturbance as a whole. Soon thereafter, the parent low separated from the medicane entirely and continued eastward, meandering toward the Aegean Sea and Turkey. Initially remaining stationary between Greece and Sicily with a minimum atmospheric pressure of 1,002 mbar (29.6 inHg), the newly formed system began to drift southwest-to-south in the following days, influenced by northeasterly flow incited by the initial low, now far to the east, and a high-pressure area above central and eastern Europe. The system's atmospheric pressure increased throughout 15 January due to the fact it was embedded within a large-scale environment, with its rising pressure due to the general prevalence of higher air pressures throughout the region, and was not a sign of weakening.

Initial wind speeds within the young medicane were generally low, with sustained winds of merely 28 to 46 km/h (17 to 29 mph; 15 to 25 kn), with the highest recorded value associated with the disturbance being 63 km/h (39 mph) at 0000 UTC on 16 January, slightly below the threshold for tropical storm on the Saffir–Simpson hurricane wind scale. Its structure now consisted of a distinct eye encircled by counterclockwise-rotating cumulonimbi with cloud top temperatures colder than −50 °C (−58 °F), evidencing deep convection and a regular feature observed in most tropical cyclones. At 1200 UTC on 16 January, a ship recorded winds blowing east-southeast of about 50 knots (93 km/h) south-southwest about 50 km (31 mi) north-northeast of the cyclone's center. Intense convection continued to follow the entire path of the system as it traversed the Mediterranean, and the cyclone made landfall in northern Libya at approximately 1800 UTC on 17 January, rapidly weakening after coming ashore. As it moved inland, a minimum atmospheric pressure of 1,012 mbar (29.9 inHg) was recorded, accompanied by wind speeds of 93 km/h (58 mph; 50 kn) as it slowed down after passing through the Gulf of Sidra. Although the system retained its strong convection for several more hours, the cyclone's cloud tops began to warm, evidencing lower clouds, before losing tropical characteristics entirely on 17 January. Offshore ship reports recorded that the medicane produced intense winds, copious rainfall, and abnormally warm temperatures.

=== September 1996 medicane ===
- Unknown-strength storm
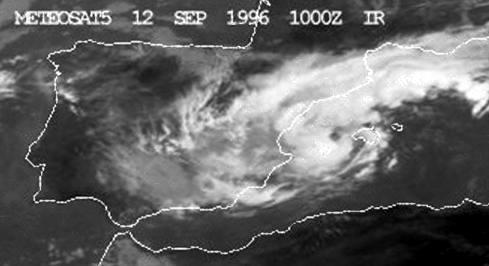
- Duration: 11 September 1996 – 13 September 1996
- Peak intensity: Winds not specified; 990 hPa (mbar)

Three notable medicanes developed in 1996. The first, in mid-September 1996, was a typical Mediterranean tropical cyclone that developed in the Balearic Islands region. At the time of the cyclone's formation, a powerful Atlantic cold front and a warm front associated with a large-scale low, producing northeasterly winds over the Iberian peninsula, extended eastward into the Mediterranean, while abundant moisture gathered in the lower troposphere over the Balearic channel. On the morning of 12 September, a disturbance developed off of Valencia, Spain, dropping heavy rainfall on the coast even without coming ashore. An eye developed shortly thereafter as the system rapidly traversed across Majorca and Sardinia in its eastward trek. It made landfall upon the coast of southern Italy on the evening of 13 September with a minimum atmospheric pressure of 990 mbar (29 inHg), dissipating shortly after coming ashore, with a diameter of about 150 km (93 mi).

At Valencia and other regions of eastern Spain, the storm generated heavy precipitation, while six tornadoes touched down over the Balearic Islands. While approaching the coast of the Balearic Islands, the warm-core low induced a pressure drop of 11 mbar (0.32 inHg) at Palma, Majorca in advance of the tropical cyclone's landfall. Medicanes as small as the one that formed in September 1996 are atypical, and often require circumstances different even from those required for regular Mediterranean tropical cyclone formation. Warm low-level advection–transfer of heat through air or sea–caused by a large-scale low over the western Mediterranean was a primary factor in the rise of strong convection. The presence of a mid- to upper-level cut-off cold-core low, a method of formation typical to medicanes, was also key to the development of intense thunderstorms within the cyclone. In addition, interaction between a northeastward-drifting trough, the medicane, and the large-scale also permitted the formation of tornadoes within thunderstorms generated by the cyclone after making landfall.

=== First October 1996 medicane ===
- Unknown-strength storm
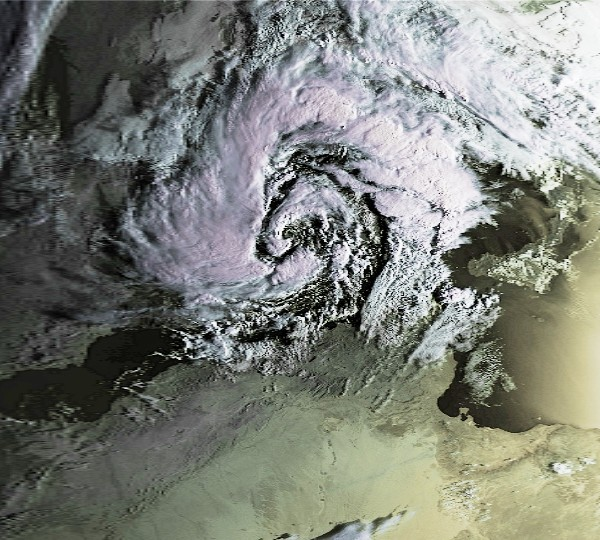
- Duration: 4 October 1996 – 7 October 1996

The second of the three recorded Mediterranean tropical cyclones in 1996 formed between Sicily and Tunisia on 4 October, making landfall on both Sicily and southern Italy. The medicane generated major flooding in Sicily. In Calabria, wind gusts of up to 108 km/h (67 mph; 58 kn) were reported in addition to severe inundation.

=== Second October 1996 medicane (Cornelia) ===
- Category 1 tropical cyclone (SSHWS)
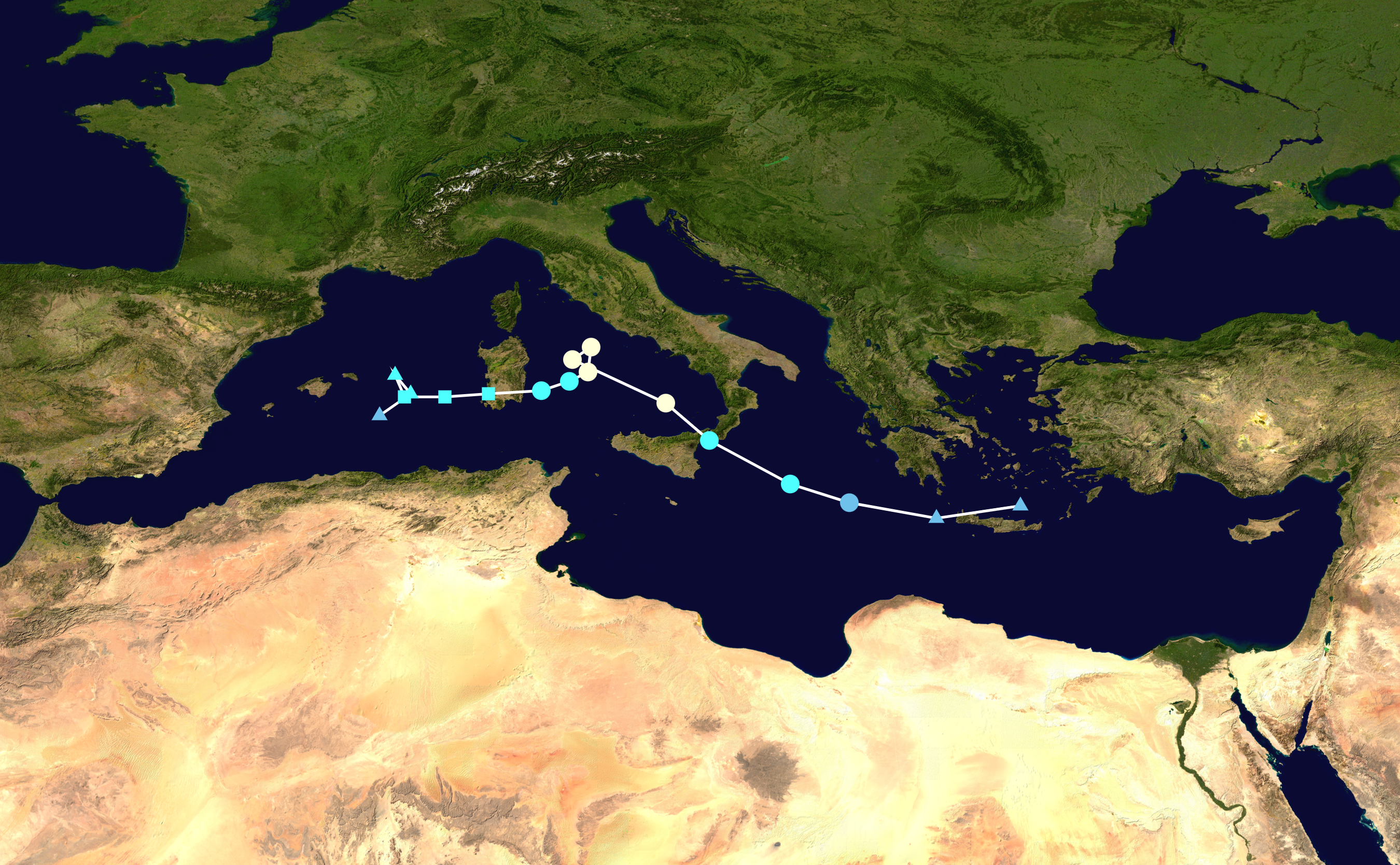
- Duration: 7 October 1996 – 10 October 1996
- Peak intensity: 150 km/h (90 mph) (1-min); 984 hPa (mbar)

The third major Mediterranean tropical cyclone of that year formed north of Algeria, and strengthened while sweeping between the Balearic Islands and Sardinia, with an eye-like feature prominent on satellite. The storm was unofficially named Cornelia. The eye of the storm was distorted and disappeared after transiting over southern Sardinia throughout the evening of 8 October, with the system weakening as a whole. On the morning of October 9, a smaller eye emerged as the system passed over the Tyrrhenian Sea, gradually strengthening, with reports 100 km (62 mi) from the storm's center reporting winds of 90 km/h (56 mph; 49 kn). Extreme damage was reported in the Aeolian Islands after the tropical cyclone passed north of Sicily, though the system dissipated while turning southward over Calabria. Overall, the lowest estimated atmospheric pressure in the third medicane was 998 mbar (29.5 inHg). Both October systems featured distinctive spiral bands, intense convection, high sustained winds, and abundant precipitation.

=== March 1999 medicane ===
- Unknown-strength storm
- Duration: 19 March 1999 – 21 March 1999

On 19 March 1999, a medicane formed in the central Mediterranean Sea and produced an eye-like feature. It continued through the central Mediterranean through 20 March and dissipated on 21 March.

=== September 1999 medicane ===
- Tropical storm (SSHWS)
- Duration: 13 September 1999 – 13 September 1999
- Peak intensity: 85 km/h (50 mph) (1-min); 1007 hPa (mbar)

On 13 September 1999, a medicane developed in the Ionian Sea between Sicily and Greece with the storm dissipating shortly after.

The storm formed over 25–27°C waters and was short lived.

== 2000s ==
=== March 2002 Black Sea medicane ===
- Unknown-strength storm
- Duration: 20 March 2002 – 23 March 2002
- Peak intensity: 75 km/h (45 mph) (1-min);

This system was recognized for its rare cold season tropical-like structure and clear eye-like feature captured in satellite imagery. It was part of a powerful weather system that caused widespread wind damage and disruption across the northwestern Black Sea region, particularly in Bulgaria and Ukraine.

=== August 2002 Black Sea medicane ===
- Subtropical storm (SSHWS)
- Duration: 7 August 2002 – 11 August 2002
- Peak intensity: 85 km/h (50 mph) (1-min);

A medicane that was part of a broader weather pattern causing catastrophic flooding and tornado/waterspout outbreaks in the Black Sea region in August 2002, particularly along the Russian coast. While its specific meteorological parameters are less documented than later storms, its historical significance is being an early recognized example of a tropical like cyclone in the Black Sea.

A Turkish meteorological analysis states that QuikSCAT satellite measurements recorded wind speeds of 72 to 90 km/h (44–56 mph; 39-48 kn). This is one of the most specific, instrument-based figures available for the system.

=== May 2003 medicane (Fernando) ===
- Subtropical storm (SSHWS)
- Duration: 25 May 2003 – 28 May 2003
- Peak intensity: 85 km/h (50 mph) (1-min); 991 hPa (mbar)

A medicane, identified in scientific literature as Cyclone Fernando, developed over the western Mediterranean Sea in May 2003. The system originated on 25 May at 12:00 UTC in the Gulf of Lion and the Balearic Sea region, triggered by the interaction of a deep upper-level cold-air drop (a cut-off low) with relatively warm sea surface temperatures.

In its early stages, the cyclone entered a quasi-stationary phase near the Balearic Islands, executing a slow eastward migration before completing a loop over the western Mediterranean. During this period, the system developed a distinct, closed-eye structure visible in satellite imagery. After looping, the vortex turned southward, steering toward the coast of Algeria before dissipating. The cyclone maintained tropical-like characteristics for approximately 42 hours, from its genesis on 25 May until 28 May 2003 at 04:30 UTC.

=== September 2003 medicane ===
- Unknown-strength storm
- Duration: 16 September 2003 – 18 September 2003

On 16 September 2003, a medicane formed in the central Mediterranean Sea. The system dissipated on 18 September 2003.

While the storm was in the Gulf of Tunis and Gulf of Hammamet, it caused extreme amounts of rainfall. There were dozens of casualties estimated from this storm, but the exact number is unknown.

=== September 2005 Black Sea medicane ===
- Tropical storm (SSHWS)
- Duration: 26 September 2005 – 29 September 2005
- Peak intensity: 100 km/h (65 mph) (1-min); 992 hPa (mbar)

In late September 2005, an upper-level low pressure system originating from over Spain was cut off by an anticyclone north of the Black Sea. The system developed into a mesoscale cyclone in the sea on 25 September in weak wind conditions and warm sea surface temperatures. The cyclone exhibited features such as a warm core, cloudless eye, and spiral cloud bands. Its traits were noted to be similar to fully tropical cyclones, leading it to be deemed a "quasi-tropical cyclone." It grew quickly in intensity between 26 and 27 September while shrinking in size to just 65 km (40 mi) wide. Its central pressure dropped to 992 mbar (29.3 inHg) the following day. The storm then turned southward and quickly decayed over land on 29 and 30 September.

Waves and strong winds from the storm were responsible for stopping cruises on their way to Istanbul from Ukraine. After it passed, sea surface temperatures in the system's path dropped 10 °C (50 °F) below normal through upwelling, resulting in a coccolithophore bloom not typically seen in autumn. The sea level was lowered by 25 cm (9.8 in).

=== Medicane Zeo ===
- Tropical storm (SSHWS)
- Duration: 13 December 2005 – 16 December 2005
- Peak intensity: 95 km/h (60 mph) (1-min); 991 hPa (mbar)

On 8 December 2005, an extratropical cyclone over the United Kingdom was named Zeo by the Free University of Berlin. The system split in two the following day, and the southern part eventually became fully cut off from the main jet. This resulted in the formation of a synoptic-scale surface cyclone over Libya on 12 and 13 December. The system had a poorly defined center until it crossed into the Mediterranean Sea, where it rapidly organized into a full-fledged medicane southwest of Tunisia on 14 December. Zeo reached its peak intensity later that day, exhibiting sustained winds of 95 km/h (59 mph; 51 kn) and a central pressure of 991 mbar (29.3 inHg). The storm had an asymmetric structure and a warm core at the time of its peak intensity. It continued moving eastward, developing an eye-like feature south of Italy and again as it passed between Crete and Libya. The storm dissipated inland over Syria on 16 December.

=== Medicane Querida ===
- Tropical storm (SSHWS)
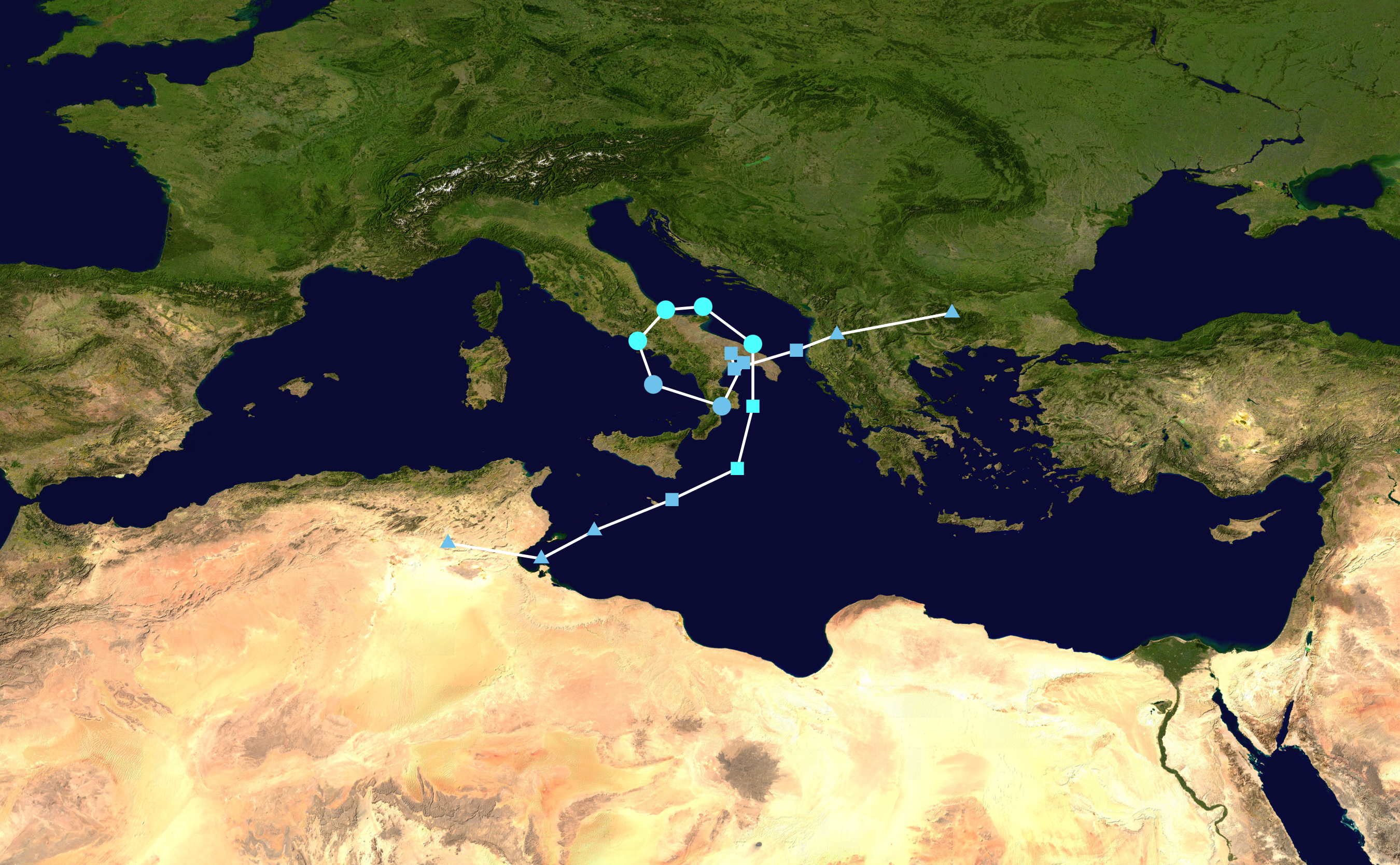
- Duration: 25 September 2006 – 27 September 2006
- Peak intensity: 85 km/h (50 mph) (1-min); 984 hPa (mbar)

A short-lived medicane, named Querida by the Free University of Berlin, developed near the end of September 2006, along the coast of Italy. The origins of the medicane can be traced to the alpine Atlas mountain range on the evening of 25 September, likely forming as a normal lee cyclone. At 0600 UTC on 26 September, European Centre for Medium-Range Weather Forecasts (ECMWF) model analyses indicated the existence of two low-pressure areas along the shoreline of Italy, one on the west coast, sweeping eastward across the Tyrrhenian Sea, while the other, slightly more intense, low was located over the Ionian Sea. As the latter low approached the Strait of Sicily, it met an eastward-moving convection-producing cold front, resulting in significant intensification, while the system simultaneously reduced in size. It then achieved a minimum atmospheric pressure of approximately 986 mbar (29.1 inHg) after transiting north-northeastward across the 40 km (25 mi)-wide Salentine peninsula in the course of roughly 30 minutes at 0915 UTC the same day.

Wind gusts surpassing 144 km/h (89 mph; 78 kn) were recorded as it passed over Salento due to a steep pressure gradient associated with it, confirmed by regional radar observations denoting the presence of a clear eye. The high winds inflicted moderate damages throughout the peninsula, though specific damage is unknown. Around 1000 UTC, both radar and satellite recorded the system's entry into the Adriatic Sea and its gradual northwestward curve back toward the Italian coast. By 1700 UTC, the cyclone made landfall in northern Apulia while maintaining its intensity, with a minimum atmospheric pressure at 988 mbar (29.2 inHg). The cyclone weakened while drifting further inland over the Italian mainland, eventually dissipating as it curved west-southwestward. A later study in 2008 evaluated that the cyclone possessed numerous characteristics seen in tropical cyclones elsewhere, with a spiral appearance, eye-like apparatus, rapid atmospheric pressure decreases in advance of landfall, and intense sustained winds, concentrated near the storm's eyewall; the apparent eye-like structure in the cyclone, however, was ill-defined. Since then, the medicane has been the subject of significant study as a result of the availability of scientific observations and reports related to the cyclone. In particular, the sensitivity of this cyclone to sea-surface temperatures, initial conditions, the model, and the parameterization schemes used in the simulations were analyzed. The relevance of different instability indices for the diagnosis and the prediction of these events were also studied.

== 2010s ==
=== Medicane Rolf ===
- Tropical storm (SSHWS)
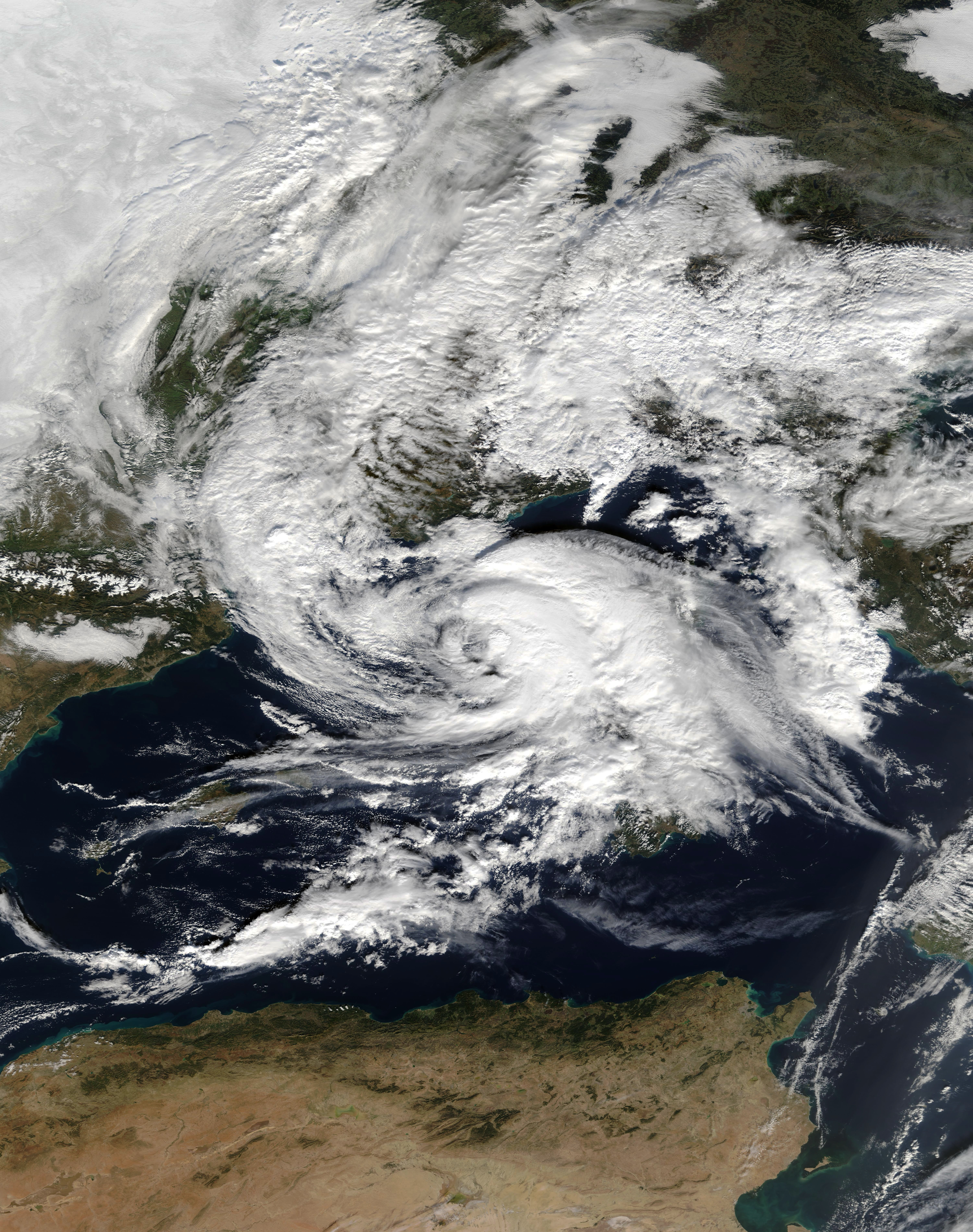
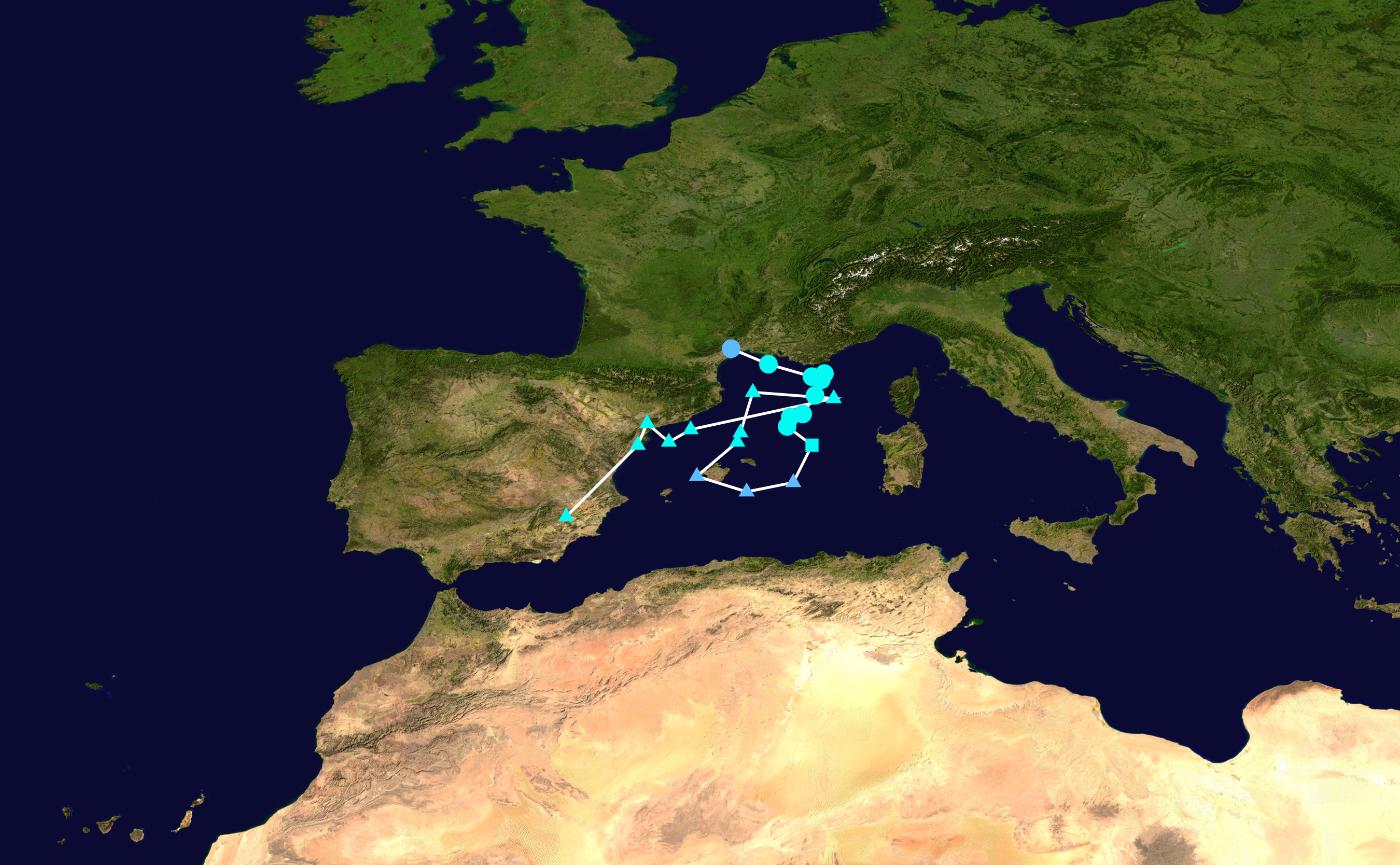
- Duration: 7 November 2011 – 9 November 2011
- Peak intensity: 85 km/h (50 mph) (1-min); 991 hPa (mbar)

In November 2011, the first officially designated Mediterranean tropical cyclone by the National Oceanic and Atmospheric Administration (NOAA) formed, christened as Tropical Storm 01M by the Satellite Analysis Branch, and given the name Rolf by the Free University of Berlin (FU Berlin), despite the fact that no agency is officially responsible for monitoring tropical cyclone activity in the Mediterranean. On 4 November 2011, a frontal system associated with another low-pressure area monitored by FU Berlin, designated Quinn, spawned a second low-pressure system inland near Marseille, which was subsequently named Rolf by the university. An upper-level trough on the European mainland stalled as it approached the Pyrenees, before approaching and interacting with the low known as Rolf. Heavy rainfall consequently fell over regions of southern France and northwestern Italy, resulting in widespread landslides and flooding. On 5 November, Rolf slowed while stationed above the Massif Central, maintaining a pressure of 1,000 mbar (30 inHg). A stationary front, stationed between Madrid and Lisbon, approached Rolf the same day, with the cold front later encountering and becoming associated with Rolf, which would continue for a couple of days.

On 6 November, the cyclone drifted toward the Mediterranean from the southern shoreline of France, with the storm's frontal structure shrinking to 150 km (93 mi) in length. Slightly weakening, Rolf neared the Balearic Islands on 7 November, associating with two fronts producing heavy rain throughout Europe, before separating entirely and transitioning into a cut-off low. On the same day, the NOAA began monitoring the system, designating it as 01M, marking the first time that the agency officially monitored a Medicane. A distinct eye-like feature developed while spiral banding and intense convection became evident. At its highest, the Dvorak technique classified the system as T3.0. Convection then gradually decreased, and a misalignment of the mid- and upper-level centers was noted. The cyclone made landfall on 9 November near Hyères in France. The system continued to rapidly weaken on 9 November, before advisories on the system were discontinued later that day, and FU Berlin followed suit by 10 November, removing the name Rolf from its weather maps and declaring the storm's dissipation. The deep warm core of this cyclone persisted for a longer time compared to most of the other documented tropical-like cyclones in the Mediterranean.

At peak intensity, the storm's maximum sustained wind speed reached 83 km/h (52 mph; 45 kn), with a minimum pressure of 991 mbar (29.3 inHg). During a nine-day period, from 1–9 November, Storm Quinn and Rolf dropped prolific amounts of rainfall across southwestern Europe, the vast majority of which came from Rolf, with a maximum total of 605 mm (23.8 in) of rain recorded in southern France. The storm caused at least $1.25 billion (2011 USD) in damages in Italy and France. The sum of fatalities totaled 12 people from Italy and France.

=== Medicane Julia ===
- Subtropical storm (SSHWS)
- Duration: 2 February 2012 – 11 February 2012
- Peak intensity: 100 km/h (65 mph) (1-min); 982 hPa (mbar)

Cyclone Julia was a long lived and deadly medicane that peaked intensity on February 6, 2012, before making landfall in Greece on February 7. Julia's development was complex, originating from an extratropical cyclone named by the Free University of Berlin over western France on January 31, 2012. The original system moved southeast into the Mediterranean but split in to two on February 2. A new low pressure center, Julia II, developed off the east coast of Spain and became the dominant system. After absorbing the original low on February 4 and passing south of Italy, Julia began to rapidly intensify on February 6. During this phase, it briefly lost its cold front and turned into a powerful subtropical storm with a warm core.

Julia reached its peak intensity late on February 6, with a minimum central pressure of 982 mbar (28.99 inHg) and sustained winds of 98 km/h (61 mph; 53 kn). On February 7, it began to weaken and regained its frontal structure as it approached the Peloponnese. Later that day, the storm made landfall on the peninsula, bringing hurricane-force wind gusts and rain. A technical report from EUMETSAT noted that surface wind speeds over maritime areas reached 59 knots (approximately 109 km/h) during the event. Some sources also claim wind speeds reached as high as 90 mph, though this is higher than the official sustained wind record.

The storm resulted in at least 12 deaths and caused over $6.4 million in damages. Heavy rainfall, combined with melting snow, triggered widespread flooding. In Bulgaria, damage totaled $4.4 million, and the Ivanovo Dam burst, flooding the village of Bisser with 2.5 meters (8 feet) of water. In Greece, the Evros River burst its banks, submerging multiple villages in the northeast. The storm's heavy snow and cold temperatures worsened the effects of the major cold wave across Europe, causing a 100-kilometer section of the Danube River to freeze.

=== Medicane Ilona ===
- Tropical storm (SSHWS)
- Duration: 19 January 2014 – 23 January 2014
- Peak intensity: 100 km/h (65 mph) (1-min); 990 hPa (mbar)

Ilona's direct precursor was a low pressure area that originated off the American East Coast, which crossed the Atlantic and reached the Mediterranean Sea. This precursor interacted with a potential vorticity (PV) streamer that formed over Greenland, which favored the initial baroclinic intensification of the cyclone as it approached the Spanish coast. The cyclone developed in the morning of 19 January 2014 over the Alboran Sea, situated between Spain and Morocco. It then moved eastward across the Western Mediterranean Sea, eventually making landfall near Naples in southern Italy around 16:00 UTC on 20 January. After crossing the Apennines and moving northward for roughly 300 km, the system reached the Adriatic Sea, where it re-intensified. During this phase, its track rotated counterclockwise as it approached the Italian coasts, a maneuver that coincided with a period of rapid intensification and the re-emergence of tropical like features. The cyclone finally dissipated over the coast of Albania.

At its peak, the cyclone deepened to a minimum central pressure of 990 mbar (29.23 inHg), while producing sustained winds of up to 100 km/h (62 mph; 54 kn) that were recorded at Gibraltar Airport.

=== Medicane Qëndresa ===
- Category 1 tropical cyclone (SSHWS)
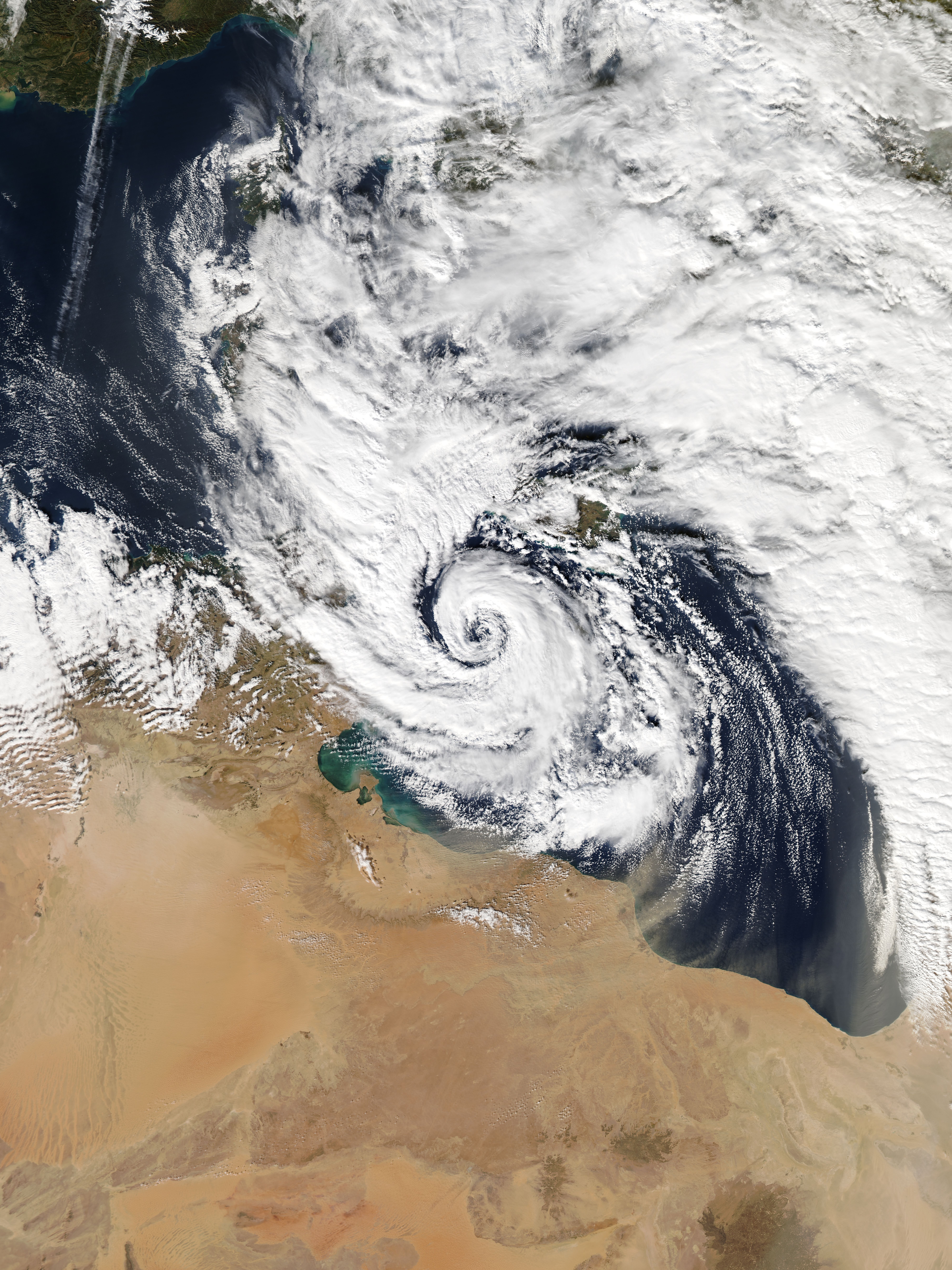
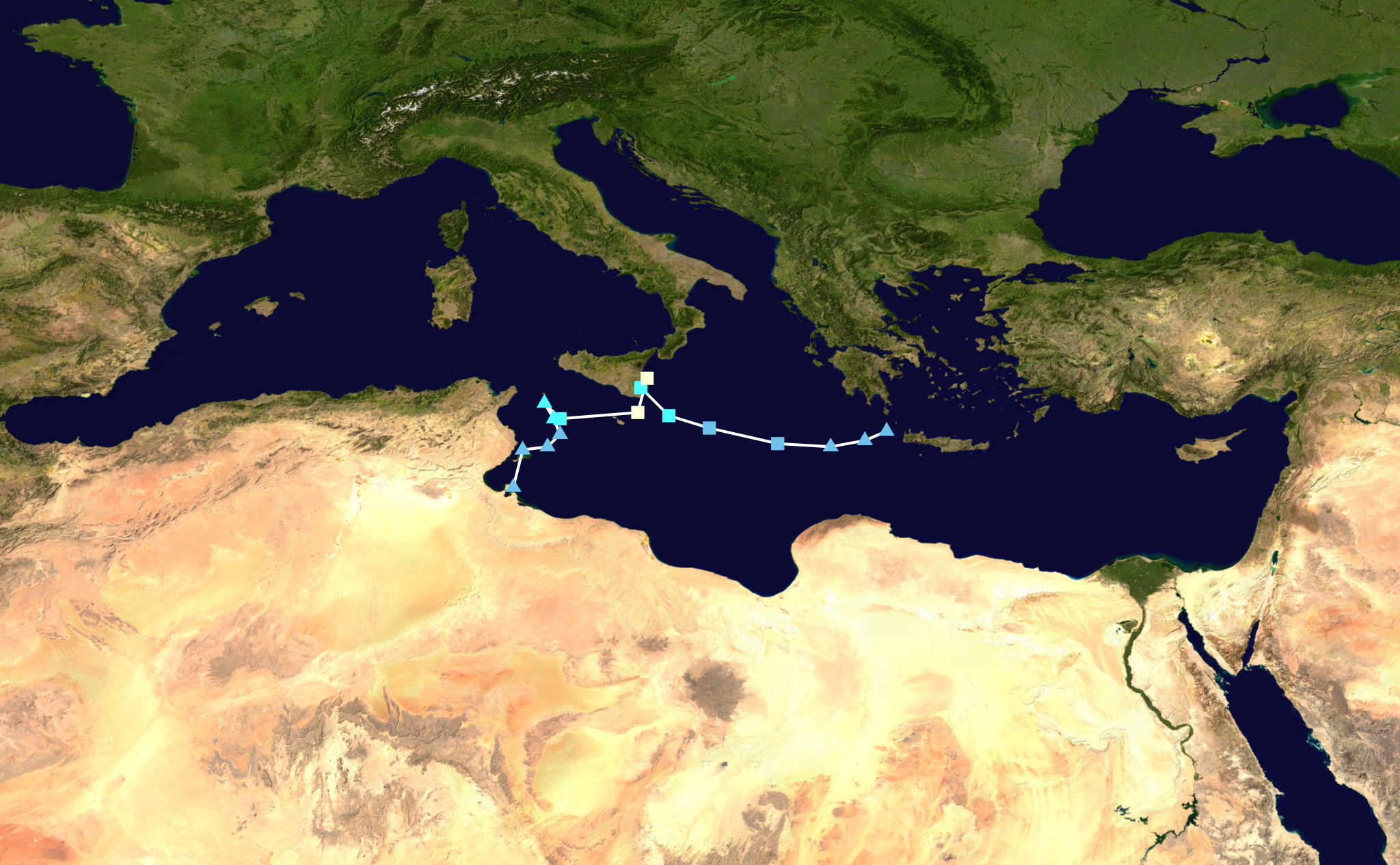
- Duration: 7 November 2014 – 9 November 2014
- Peak intensity: 120 km/h (75 mph) (1-min); 978 hPa (mbar)

On 6 November 2014, the low-level circulation centre of Qëndresa formed near Kerkennah Islands. As the system was moving north-northeastwards and combining with an upper-level low from Tunisia early on 7 November, the system occluded quickly and intensified dramatically with an eye-like feature, thanks to favourable conditions. Qëndresa directly hit Malta when it had lost its fronts with a more well-defined eye, with ten-minute sustained winds at 110.9 km/h (68.9 mph; 59.9 kn) and the gust at 153.7 km/h (95.5 mph; 83.0 kn). The central pressure was presumed to be 978 hPa (28.9 inHg). Interacting with Sicily, the cyclone turned northeastwards and started to make an anticlockwise loop. On 8 November, Qëndresa crossed Syracuse in the morning and then significantly weakened. Turning southeastwards then moving eastwards, Qëndresa moved over Crete, before dissipating over the island on 11 November.

=== Medicane Xandra ===
- Tropical storm (SSHWS)
- Duration: 1 December 2014 – 3 December 2014
- Peak intensity: 85 km/h (50 mph) (1-min); 993 hPa (mbar)

Xandra originated from an extratropical cyclone of the same name on 28 November near the Iberian Peninsula. The extratropical cyclone weakened, and a new low pressure area developed over the eastern Iberian Peninsula. This new low's circulation became more well defined as it strengthened over the sea with an eye-like feature. On 1 December, Xandra brought heavy rain to the Balearic Islands. By early on 2 December, the storm developed subtropical characteristics over 18–19°C sea surface temperatures, becoming a medicane at 06:00 UTC that day. Later that day, Xandra's circulation became more symmetrical and organized, which made it a tropical storm at 18:00 UTC. The cyclone became more organized during the night hours as it approached Italy. Early on 3 December, Xandra gained an eye which appeared on Italian radar maps. Xandra made landfall near Civitavecchia, Italy at 08:30 UTC, which led to the rapid weakening and eventual dissipation over Italy later that day at 12:00 UTC.

=== Medicane Trixi (90M) ===
- Tropical storm (SSHWS)
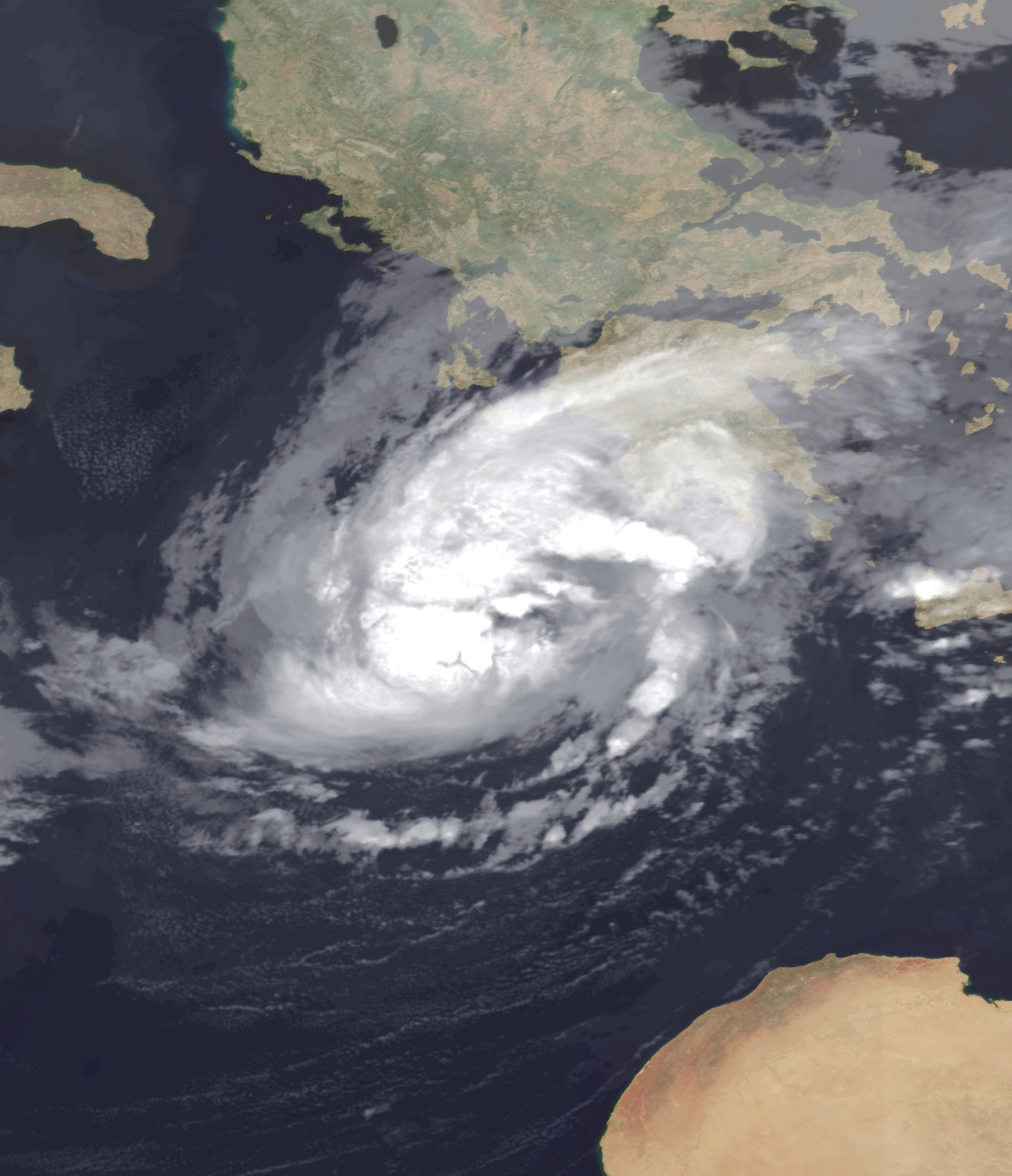
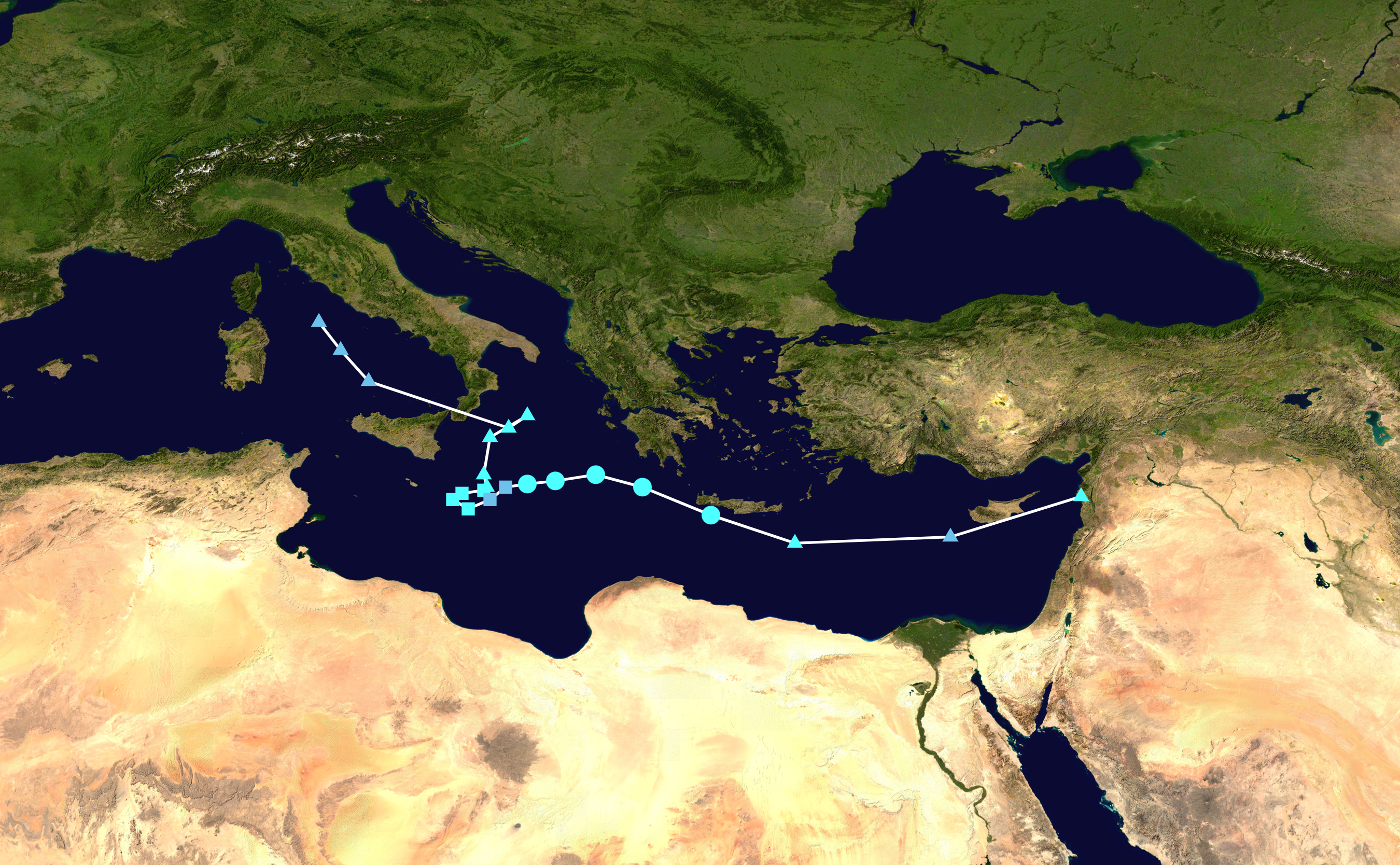
- Duration: 29 October 2016 – 31 October 2016
- Peak intensity: 110 km/h (70 mph) (1-min); 992 hPa (mbar)

Early on 28 October 2016, an extratropical cyclone began to develop to the south of Calabria, in the Ionian sea. The system quickly intensified, attaining wind speeds of 80 km/h (50 mph) as it slowly moved to the west, causing high waves and minor damage to cars near the Maltese city of Valletta, weakening the following day and beginning to move eastward. Later that day, it began to re-intensify and underwent a tropical transition. At 12:00 UTC on 30 October, the system exhibited 10-minute sustained winds of 104 km/h (64 mph; 56 kn). It became a tropical storm on 31 October. After passing over Crete, the storm began to quickly weaken, with the storm degenerating into an extratropical low on 1 November. Tropical Storm 90M was also nicknamed "Medicane Trixi" by some media outlets in Europe during its existence.

No fatalities or rainfall statistics have been reported for this system as it was over open waters for most of the time.

=== Medicane Numa ===
- Tropical storm (SSHWS)
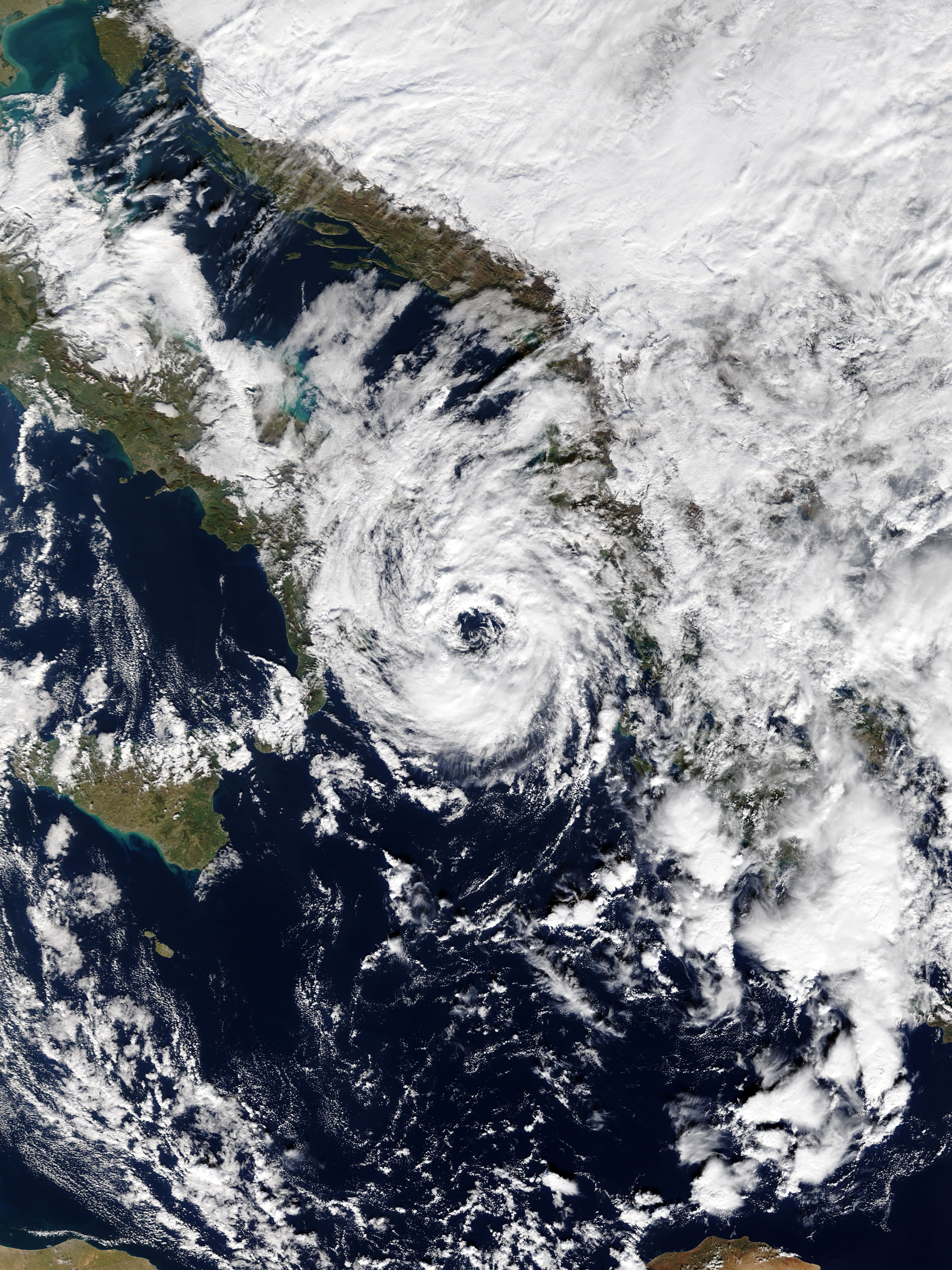
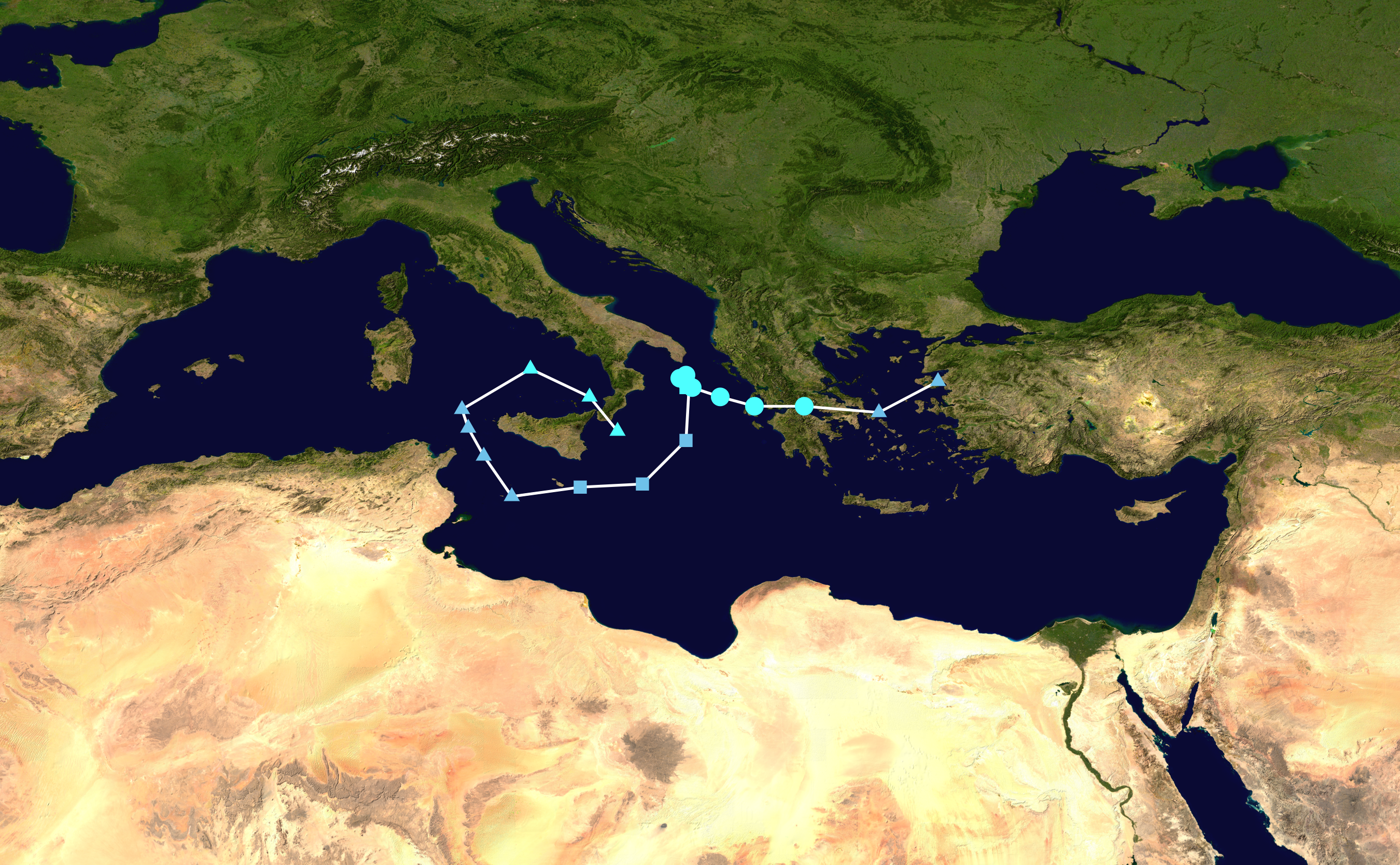
- Duration: 16 November 2017 – 19 November 2017
- Peak intensity: 100 km/h (65 mph) (1-min); 994 hPa (mbar)

On 11 November 2017, the remnant of Tropical Storm Rina from the Atlantic contributed to the formation of a new extratropical cyclone, west of the British Isles, which later absorbed Rina on the next day. On 12 November, the new storm was named Numa by the Free University of Berlin. On 14 November 2017, Extratropical Cyclone Numa emerged into the Adriatic Sea. On the following day, while crossing Italy, Numa began to undergo a subtropical transition, though the system was still extratropical by 16 November. The storm began to impact Greece as a strong storm on 16 November. Some computer models forecast that Numa could transition into a warm-core subtropical or tropical cyclone within the next few days. On 17 November, Numa completely lost its frontal system. On the afternoon of the same day, Météo France tweeted that Numa had attained the status of a subtropical Mediterranean depression. During the next several hours, Numa continued to strengthen, before reaching its peak intensity on 18 November, as a strong subtropical storm. According to ESTOFEX, Numa showed numerous 83-kilometre-per-hour (52 mph; 45 kn) flags of 10-minute sustained winds in satellite data. Between 18:00 UTC on 17 November and 5:00 UTC on 18 November, Numa acquired evident tropical characteristics, and began to display a hurricane-like structure. ESTOFEX again reported 83 km/h (52 mph; 45 kn). Later on the same day, Numa made landfall in Greece with a station at Kefalonia reporting peak winds of 110 km/h (69 mph; 60 kn) at 998 hPa (29.5 inHg). The cyclone rapidly weakened into a low-pressure area, before emerging into the Aegean Sea on 19 November. On 20 November, Numa was absorbed into another extratropical storm approaching from the north.

Numa hit Greece at a time when the soil was already heavily soaked from other storm systems that did arrive before Numa. The area was forecast to receive up to more than 400 mm (16 in) of additional rains in an 48 hours period starting with 16 November. No rainfall forecasts or measurements are known for the following days while Numa was still battering Greece. Numa resulted in 21 reported deaths. At least 1,500 homes were flooded, and residents had to evacuate their homes. The storm caused an estimated US$100 million in damages in Europe and was the deadliest weather event Greece had experienced since 1977.

=== September 2018 Black Sea medicane ===
- Tropical storm (SSHWS)
- Duration: 7 September 2018 – 12 September 2018
- Peak intensity: 75 km/h (45 mph) (1-min); 999 hPa (mbar)

A system developed near Crimea on 7 September, crossing the Kerch Strait near peak intensity on 8 September, moving into the Sea of Azov, looping counterclockwise around Crimea, and dissipating on 12 September 2018. The system was analyzed with a central pressure of 1,000 mbar (30 inHg) during its mature stage. Some forum analyses suggest it may have deepened slightly further, to approximately 999 mbar (29.5 inHg). Wind speeds were estimated at around 75 km/h (47 mph; 40 kn).

Several waterspouts were reported in coastal cities like Yalta and Feodosiya. The heavy rainfall led to significant flooding, with 74 mm (2.9 in) of rain recorded in Yalta and 71 mm (2.8 in) on the Ai-Petri mountain plateau.

=== Medicane Zorbas ===
- Category 1 tropical cyclone (SSHWS)
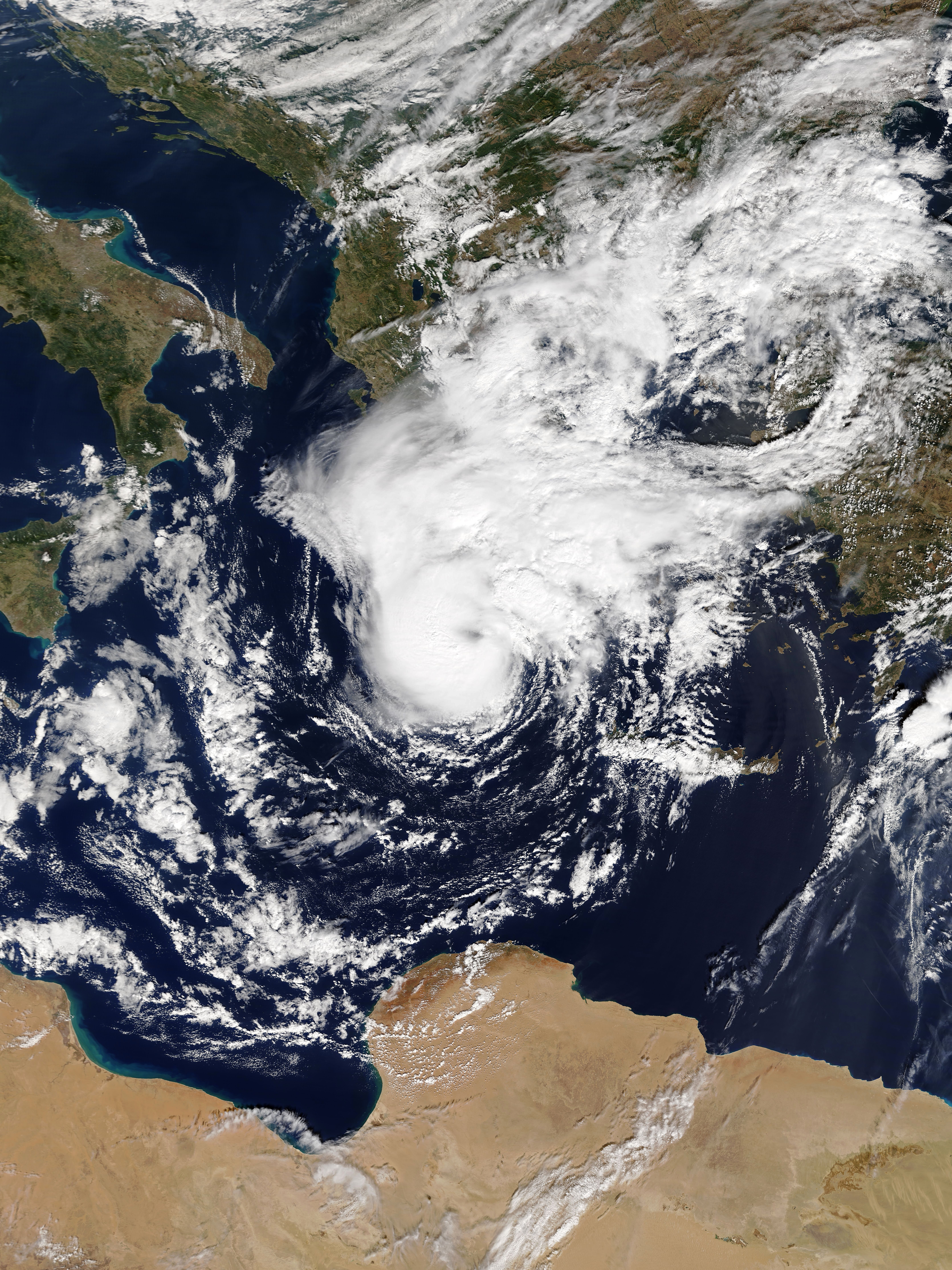
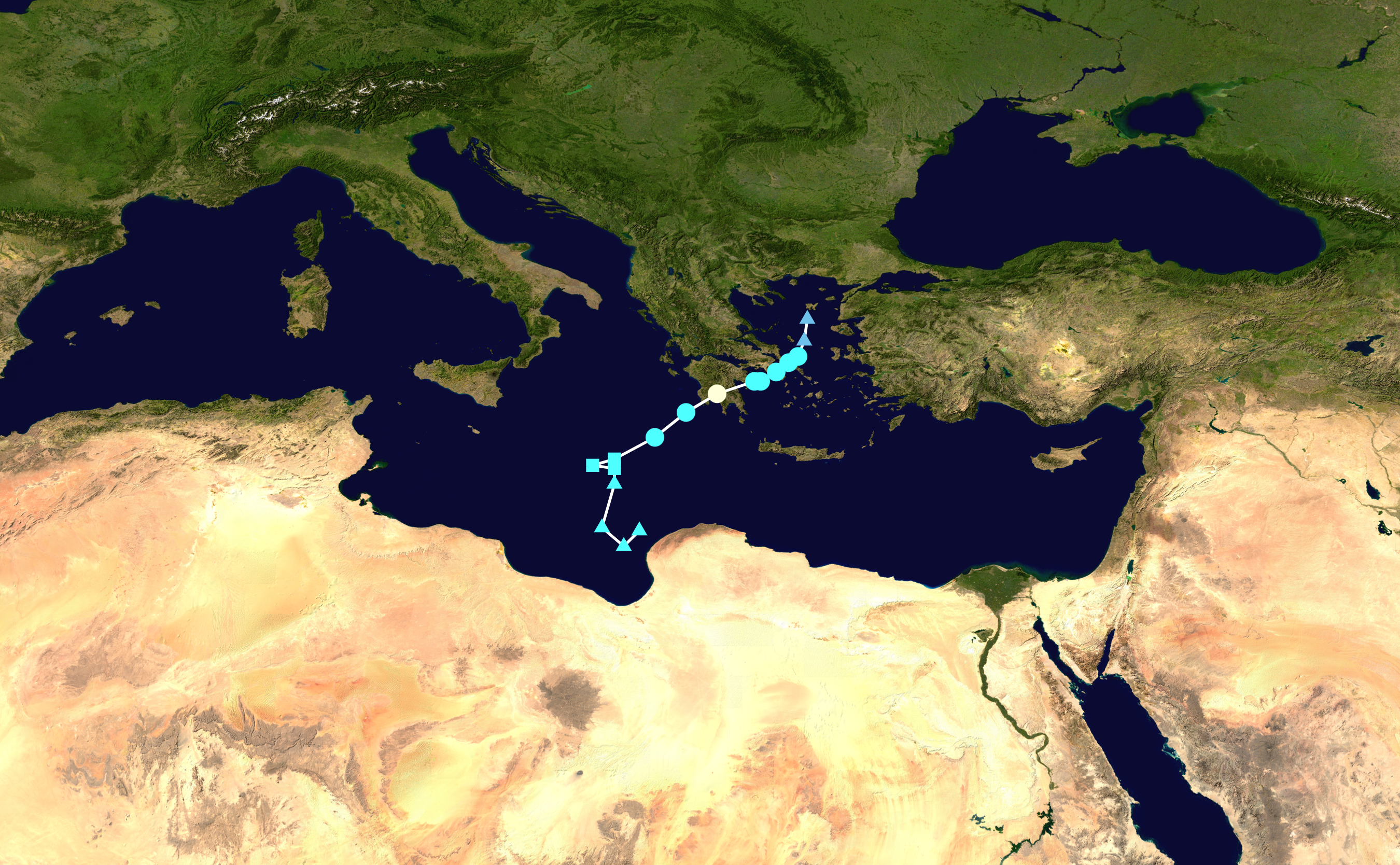
- Duration: 28 September 2018 – 1 October 2018
- Peak intensity: 120 km/h (75 mph) (1-min); 987 hPa (mbar)

A first outlook about the possible development of a shallow warm-core cyclone in the Mediterranean was issued by ESTOFEX on 25 September 2018, and a second extended outlook was issued on 26 September 2018. On 27 September 2018, an extratropical storm developed in the eastern Mediterranean Sea. Water temperatures of around 27 °C (81 °F) supported the storm's transition into a hybrid cyclone, with a warm thermal core in the center. The storm moved northeastward toward Greece, gradually intensifying and developing characteristics of a tropical cyclone. On September 29, the storm made landfall at peak intensity in the Peloponnese, west of Kalamata, where a minimum central pressure of 989.3 mbar (29.21 inHg) was reported. ESTOFEX reported on Zorbas as "Mediterranean Cyclone 2018M02", with the same pressure of 989 mbar (29.2 inHg) at Kalamata, further estimating the minimum central pressure of the cyclone to be 987 mbar (29.1 inHg), with one-minute maximum sustained winds of 120 km/h (75 mph; 65 kn) and a Dvorak number of T4.0, which all translate into marginal Category 1 hurricane characteristics for the cyclone.

It is unknown who named the system Zorbas, but the name is officially recognized for a medicane by the Deutscher Wetterdienst. Early on 1 October, Zorbas emerged into the Aegean Sea, while accelerating northeastward. On 2 October, Zorbas moved over northwestern Turkey and dissipated. A cold wake was observed in the Mediterranean Sea, with sea surface temperatures dropping 3–4 °C (5–7 °F) along the track of Zorbas due to strong upwelling.

During its formative stages, the storm caused flash flooding in Tunisia and Libya, with around 200 mm (7.9 in) of rainfall observed. The floods killed five people in Tunisia, while also damaging homes, roads, and fields. The Tunisian government pledged financial assistance to residents whose homes were damaged. In advance of the storm's landfall in Greece, the Hellenic National Meteorological Office issued a severe warning. Several flights were canceled, and schools were closed. The offshore islands of Strofades and Rhodes reported gale-force winds during the storm's passage. A private weather station in Voutsaras measured wind gusts of 105 km/h (65 mph; 56 kn). The storm spawned a waterspout that moved onshore. Gale-force winds in Athens knocked down trees and power lines. A fallen tree destroyed the roof of a school in western Athens. Dozens of roads were closed due to flooding. In Ioannina, the storm damaged the minaret on the top of the Aslan Pasha Mosque, which dates to 1614. From 29 to 30 September, Zorbas produced flash flooding in Greece and parts of western Turkey, with the storm dropping as much as 200 mm (7.9 in) in Greece and spawning multiple waterspouts. Three people were reporting missing in Greece after the flash floods; one person was found dead, but the other two individuals remained missing, as of 3 October. Zorbas was estimated to have caused millions of dollars (2018 USD) in damages.

=== Medicane Scott ===
- Tropical storm (SSHWS)
- Duration: 24 October 2019 – 26 October 2019
- Peak intensity: 65 km/h (40 mph) (1-min); 1010 hPa (mbar)

Scott formed in the far eastern Mediterranean Sea in late October 2019, bringing heavy rainfall and flooding to Israel and northern Egypt, including Cairo. The formation of a medicane this far east in the Mediterranean was described as highly unusual by the Met Office.

=== Medicane Trudy (Detlef) ===
- Tropical storm (SSHWS)
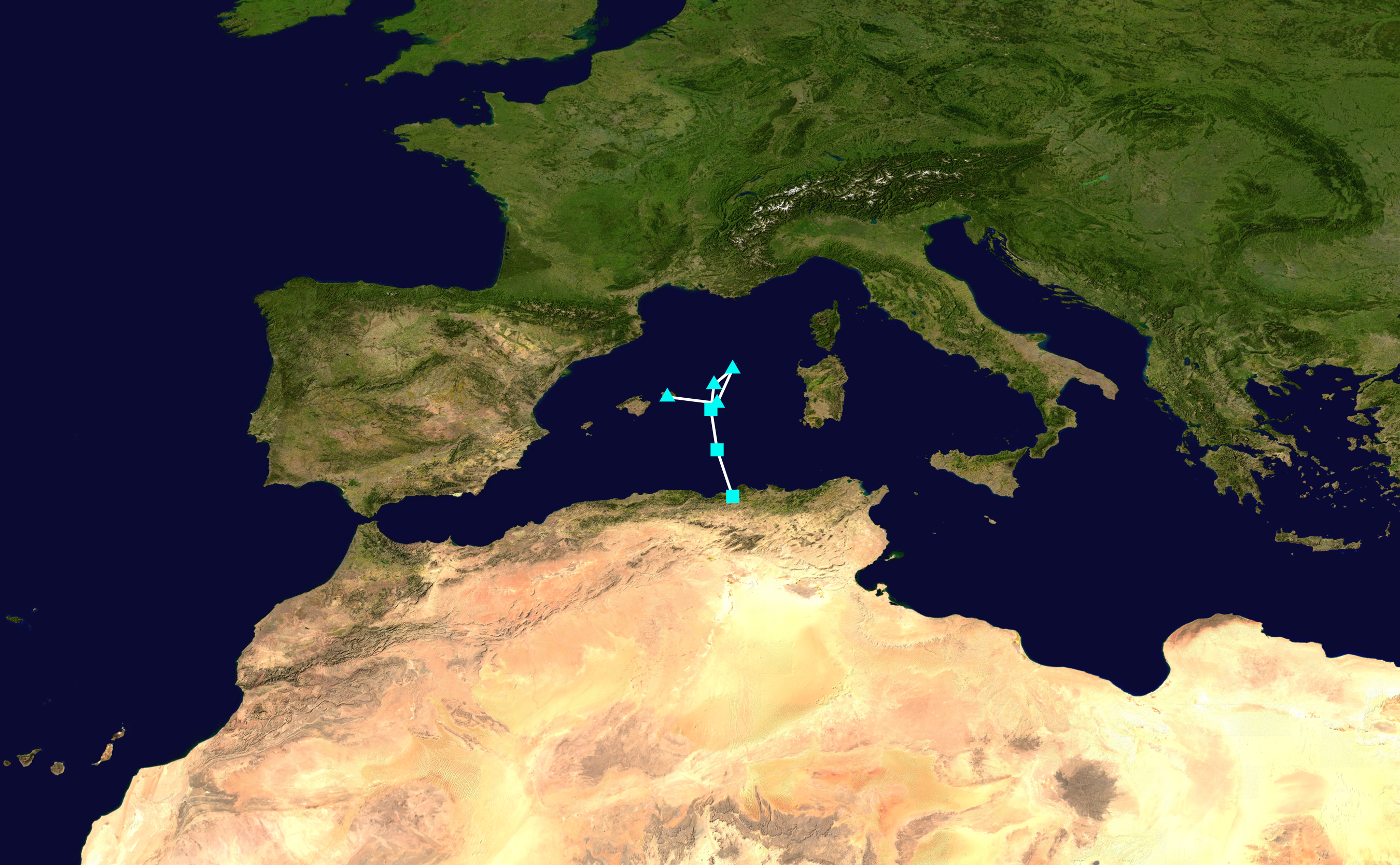
- Duration: 11 November 2019 – 13 November 2019
- Peak intensity: 85 km/h (50 mph) (1-min); 995 hPa (mbar)

Trudy, also known as Detlef and Bernardo, formed between Sardinia and the northern coast of Algeria in mid-November 2019, subsequently tracking to the northeast across mainland Italy and into the Adriatic Sea. High winds, fallen trees and flooding were reported across northern Algeria.

== 2020s ==
=== Medicane Ianos ===
- Category 2 tropical cyclone (SSHWS)
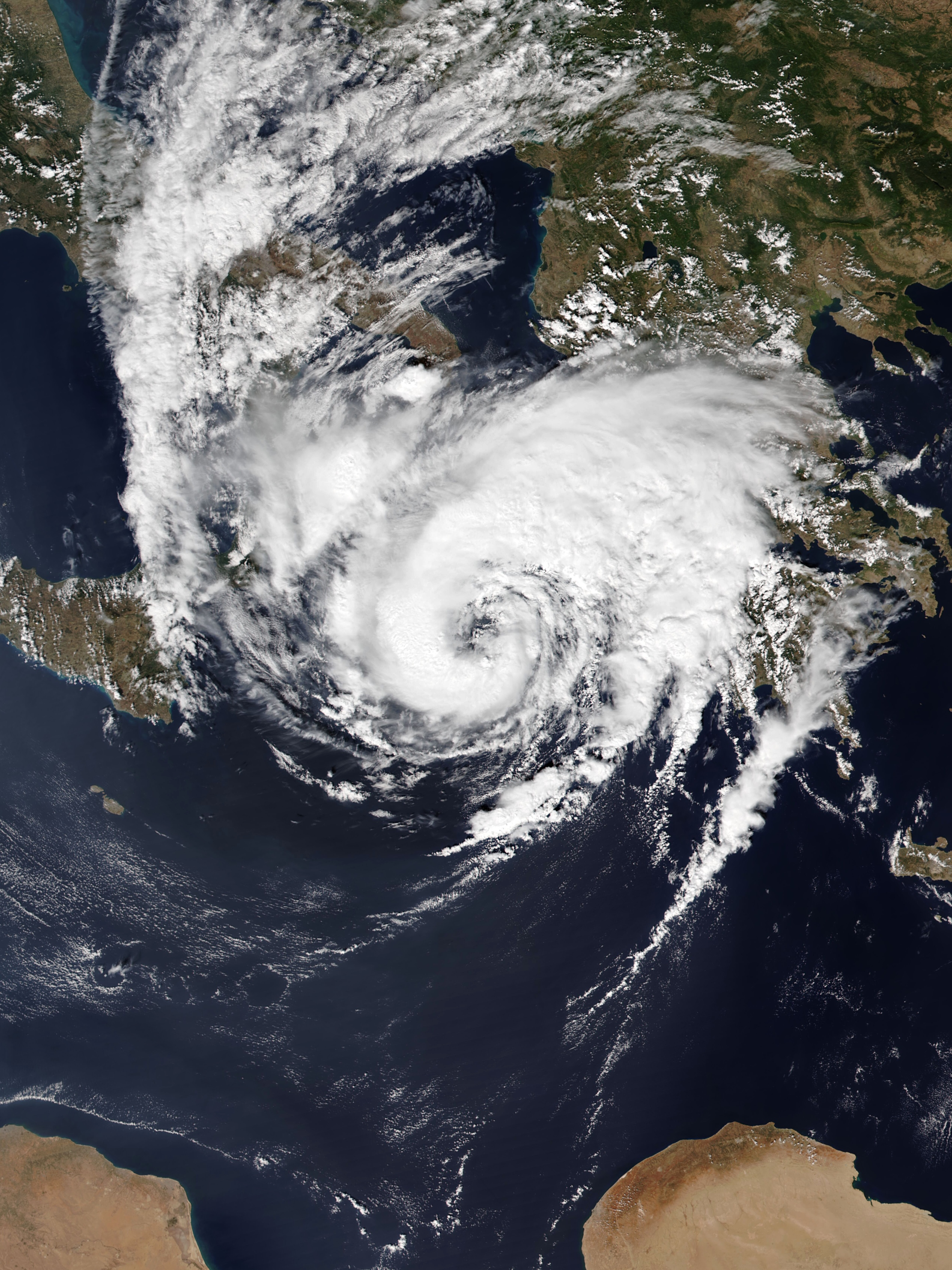
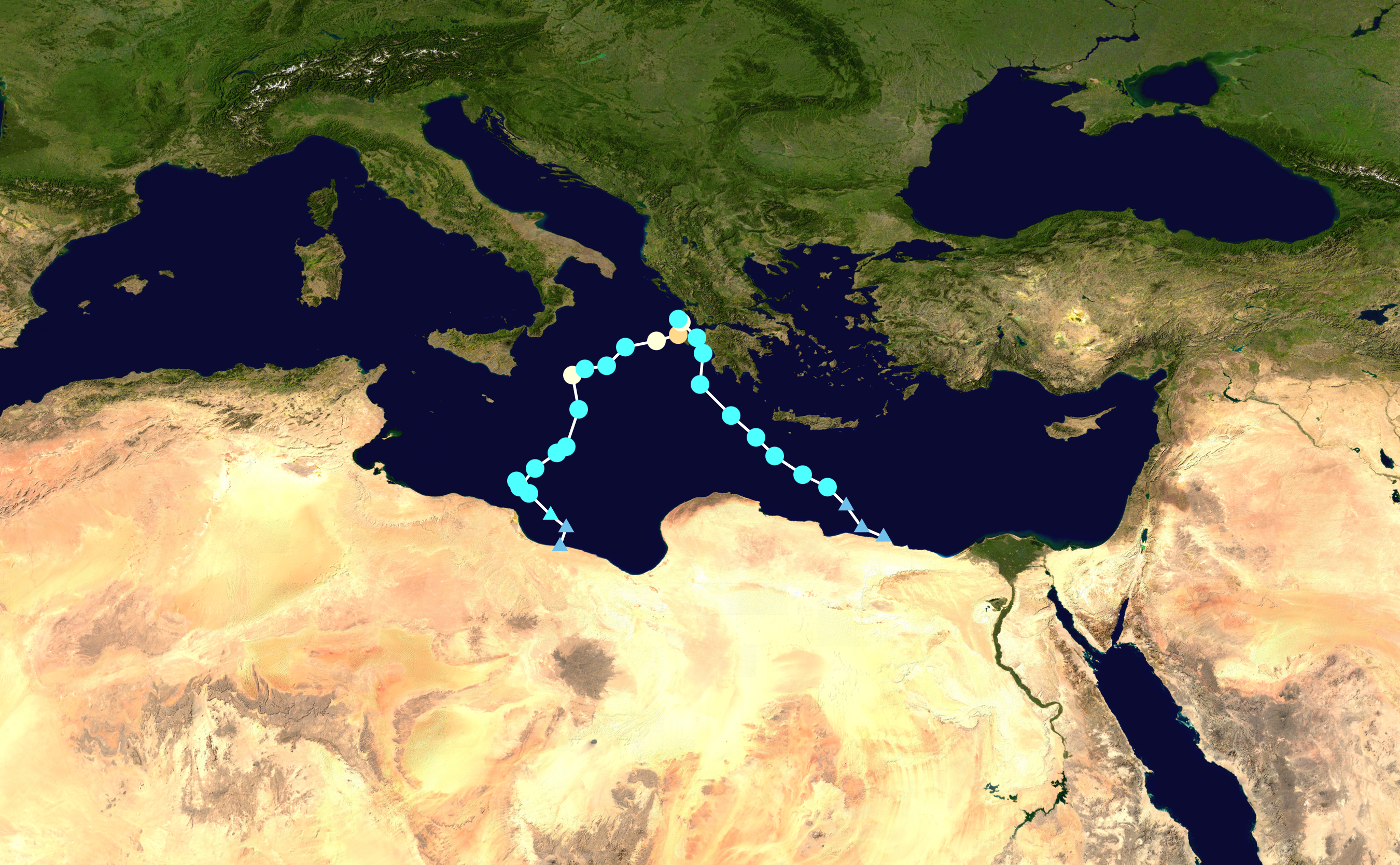
- Duration: 15 September 2020 – 20 September 2020
- Peak intensity: 160 km/h (100 mph) (1-min); 982 hPa (mbar)

On 14 September 2020, a low-pressure area began to develop over the Gulf of Sidra, quickly developing in the coming hours while slowly moving northwest with a wind speed of around 50 km/h (31 mph; 27 kn). By 15 September, it had intensified to 65 km/h (40 mph; 35 kn) with a minimum pressure of 1010 hPa, with further development predicted over the coming days. The cyclone had strong potential to become tropical over the next several days due to warm sea temperatures of 27 to 28 °C (81 to 82 °F) in the region. Weather models predicted that it would likely hit the west coast of Greece on 17 or 18 September. Ianos gradually intensified over the Mediterranean Sea, acquiring an eye-like feature. Ianos made landfall on Greece at peak intensity on 03:00 UTC on 18 September, with winds peaking near 160 km/h (99 mph; 86 kn) and a minimum central pressure estimated at 984.3 hPa (29.07 inHg), equivalent to a minimal Category 2 hurricane.

Greece assigned the system the name "Ianos" (Ιανός), sometimes anglicized to "Janus", while the German weather service used the name "Udine"; the Turkish used "Tulpar", and the Italians "Cassilda". As Ianos passed to the south of Italy on 16 September, it produced heavy rain across the southern part of the country and in Sicily. As much as 35 mm (1.4 in) of rain was reported in Reggio Calabria, more than the city's normal monthly rainfall.

Ianos left four dead people and one missing, in addition to strong tides in Ionian islands such as Kefalonia, Zakynthos, Ithaca and Lefkada, and 120 km/h (75 mph; 65 kn) winds at Karditsa which brought down trees and power lines, and caused landslides.

=== Medicane Masinissa (David) ===
- Subtropical storm (SSHWS)
- Duration: 21 November 2020 – 22 November 2020
- Peak intensity: 95 km/h (60 mph) (1-min); 1007 hPa (mbar)

On 19 November, a new extratropical low developed over Northern Italy as a result of lee cyclogenesis south of the Alps. The cyclone, which was named Masinissa by a group of amateur meteorologists, subsequently moved southward across the Central Mediterranean, producing heavy thunderstorms and rainfall over parts of mainland Italy, Corsica, Sardinia and Tunisia. During the night of 20 November, convection gradually increased around its well-defined center and began to detach from the associated frontal zones. By 06:00 UTC on 21 November, the cyclone had transitioned into a subtropical storm near Sicily. The system continued toward the Tunisian coast, becoming increasingly organized before making landfall just north of Mahdia at around 13:30 UTC on 22 November.

=== Medicane Elaina (Andira, 03M) ===
- Tropical storm (SSHWS)
- Duration: 15 December 2020 – 17 December 2020
- Peak intensity: 100 km/h (65 mph) (1-min); 994 hPa (mbar)

Elaina, also designed Andira and 03M, formed off the coast of Cyprus in mid-December 2020 and subsequently made landfall in Lebanon.

=== Medicane Falchion ===
- Subtropical depression (SSHWS)
- Duration: 12 August 2021 – 16 August 2021
- Peak intensity: 55 km/h (35 mph) (1-min); 1006 hPa (mbar)

Falchion originated as a broad area of low pressure over the central Black Sea on 7 August 2021. The system moved northeast toward the Azov Sea, becoming more organized and moving westward by 10 August. It then moved across the Black Sea, making landfall near Crimea, southeastern Ukraine, and southwestern Russia by 12–13 August. After landfall, the cyclone's circulation broadened and it began a rapid decay phase, eventually drifting back over the Sea of Azov. Its movement was significantly impeded by a blocking event over central Asia during August 2021, which caused it to become nearly stationary at times.

A detailed analysis in the journal Meteorology (2022) classified Falchion as a subtropical cyclone. The study noted that it was "as strong as a tropical depression". Falchion was blamed for damage and more than 30 fatalities across Turkey.

=== Medicane Apollo (Nearchus) ===
- Tropical storm (SSHWS)
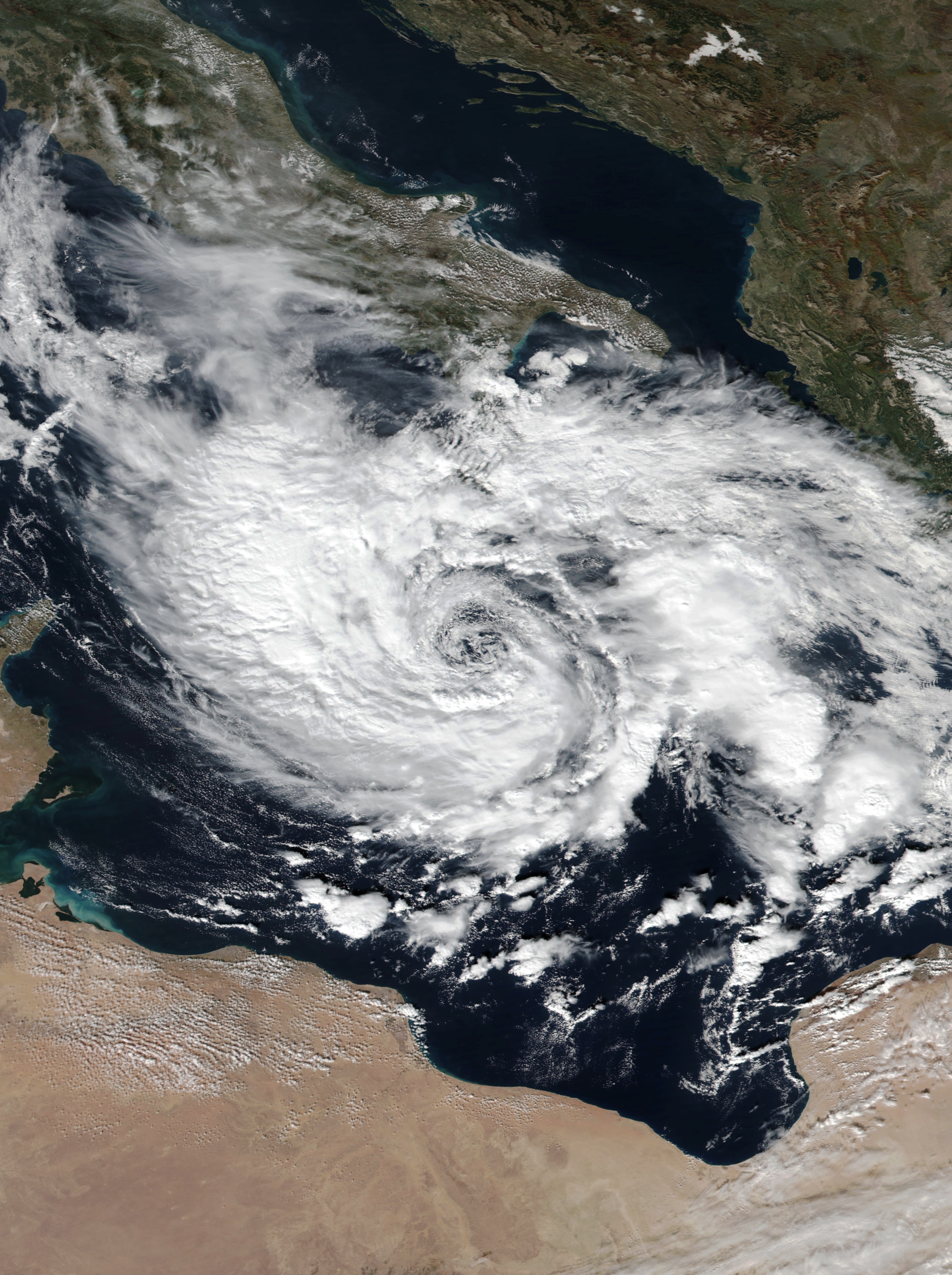
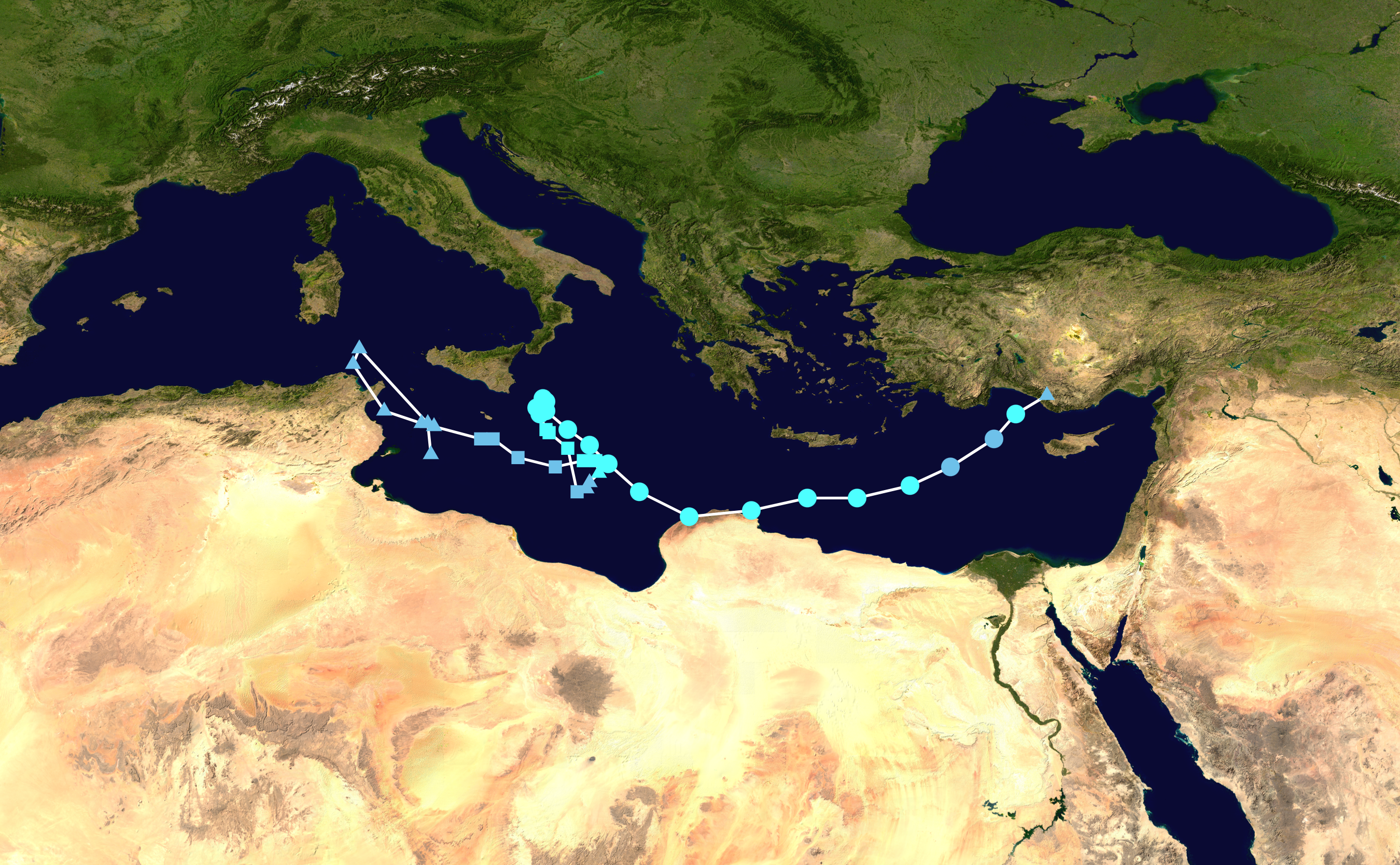
- Duration: 25 October 2021 – 2 November 2021
- Peak intensity: 105 km/h (65 mph) (1-min); 999 hPa (mbar)

Around 22 October 2021, an area of organized thunderstorms formed near the Balearic Islands, with the disturbance becoming more organized and developing an area of low pressure around 24 October. The low started to form a low level center the next day and moved around the Tyrrhenian Sea, and around 28 October, the low became better organized, prompting forecast offices in Europe to name it.

The most commonly used name for the cyclone is Apollo, which was used by the Free University of Berlin. On the same day, the agency Meteo of the National Observatory of Athens in Greece named it Nearchus, after the voyager of the same name.

Heavy rain from the cyclone and its precursor caused heavy rainfall and flooding in Tunisia, Algeria, Southern Italy, and Malta, killing seven people in total. The storm caused over US$245 million (€219 million) in damages.

=== Medicane Blas ===
- Subtropical storm (SSHWS)
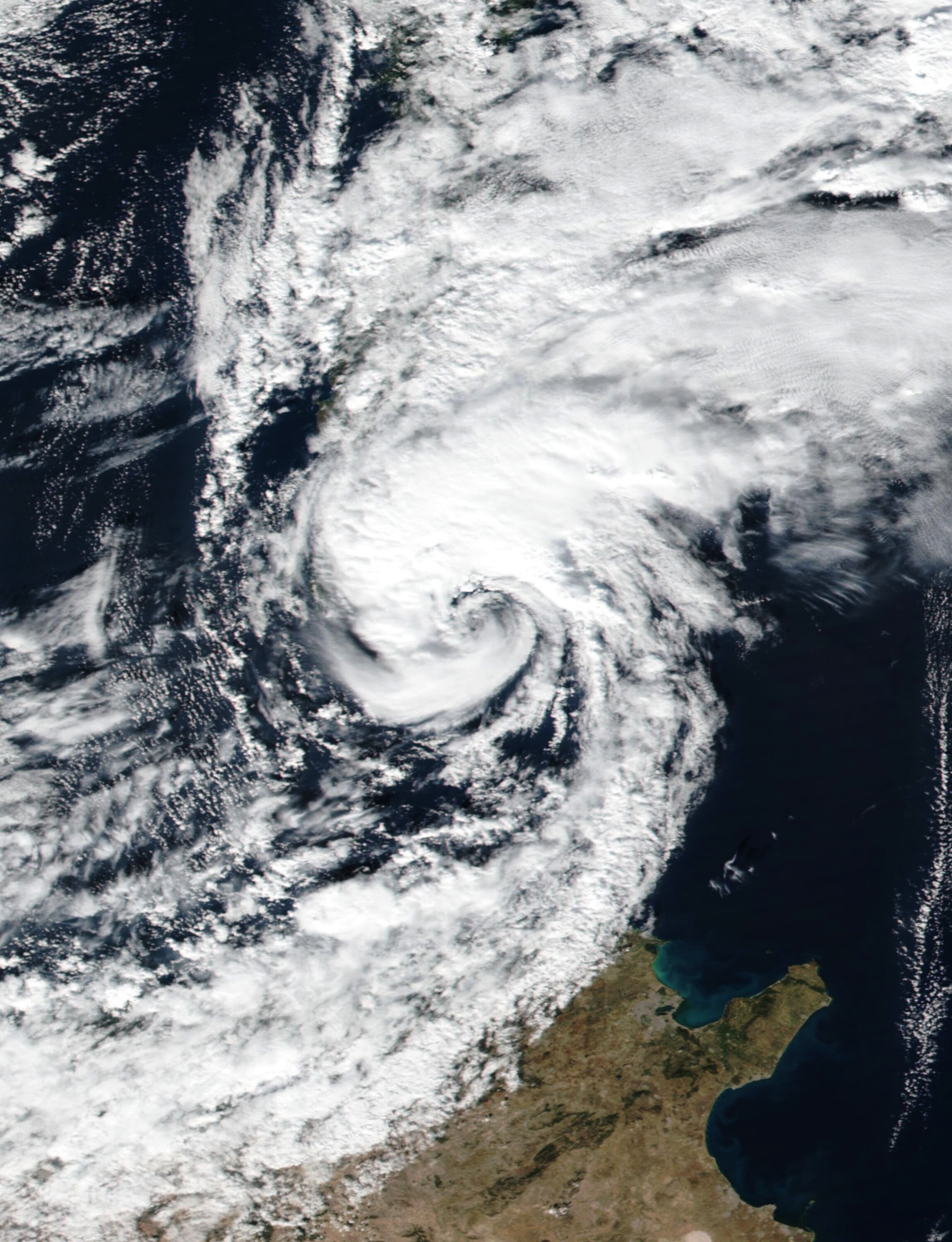
- Duration: 11 November 2021 – 15 November 2021
- Peak intensity: 85 km/h (50 mph) (1-min); 1004 hPa (mbar)

On 5 November 2021, the Spanish Meteorological Agency (AEMET) started tracking a low near the Balearic Islands and named it Blas. An orange alert was issued for these islands, for coastal impacts and rain. The north of Catalonia was declared an Orange Zone, as strong winds blew inland from the Spanish Navarre and Aragon. Météo-France also issued a yellow alert for Aude and Pyrénées-Orientales for wind, as well as Corsica for rain. As the system stalled between Sardinia and the Balearic Islands on 8 November, AEMET predicted a strengthening trend for the next two days and maintained its alerts. At 00:00 UTC on 11 November, the system came very close to the Balearic Islands again. On 13 November, the storm developed a spiral structure similar to those of tropical cyclones, while shedding its frontal structure. After striking the islands again, the storm then slowly weakened while drifting back southeastward. On 14 November, the cyclone turned northward, moving over Sardinia and Corsica, before curving back southwestward on 15 November and moving over Sardinia again, while restrengthening in the process. On 16 November, Blas turned eastward once again, passing just south of Sardinia and moving towards Italy, before dissipating over the Tyrrhenian Sea on 18 November.

On 6 November, gusts of 75 km/h (47 mph; 40 kn) were recorded at Es Mercadal and 95 km/h (59 mph; 51 kn) at the lighthouse of Capdepera in the Balearic Islands where waves of 8 m (26 ft) hit the coast. Menorca was cut off from the world after the closure of the ports of Mahón and Ciutadella. On 9 and 10 November, Blas brought high winds and heavy rain again to the Balearic Islands, causing at least 36 incidents, mostly flooding, landslides and blackouts. A crew member had to be rescued after his sailboat's mast broke, leaving the boat adrift 80 km (50 mi) west of Sóller. On 6 November, a waterspout was reported in Melilla, a Spanish enclave on the coast of Morocco. In France, gusts of 140 km/h (87 mph; 76 kn) were recorded on 7 November at Cap Béar, as well as 111 km/h (69 mph; 60 kn) in Leucate and 100 km/h (62 mph; 54 kn) in Lézignan-Corbières. The storm caused severe weather on the Algerian coast, with exceptional rainfall. On 9 November, a building collapsed in Algiers, following torrential rains on the city, causing the deaths of three people. On 11 November, the heavy rain falling on Algiers caused another landslide to strike houses in the Raïs Hamidou neighborhood, causing the deaths of three other people. From 8 to 11 November, convective bands associated with the storm caused 3 deaths in Sicily, bringing the total death toll to nine people. Damage from the storm has not yet been assessed.

=== Medicane Ciprian ===
- Tropical storm (SSHWS)
- Duration: 16 October 2022 – 20 October 2022
- Peak intensity: 75 km/h (45 mph) (1-min); 1006 hPa (mbar)

A short-lived, weak tropical-like cyclone meandered near Cyprus in mid-October 2022. While it was not officially named by any national meteorological service, it was unofficially named Ciprian by researchers and was officially classified by the UK Met Office as a tropical storm with the designation '01M' .

=== Medicane Hannelore ===
- Subtropical storm (SSHWS)
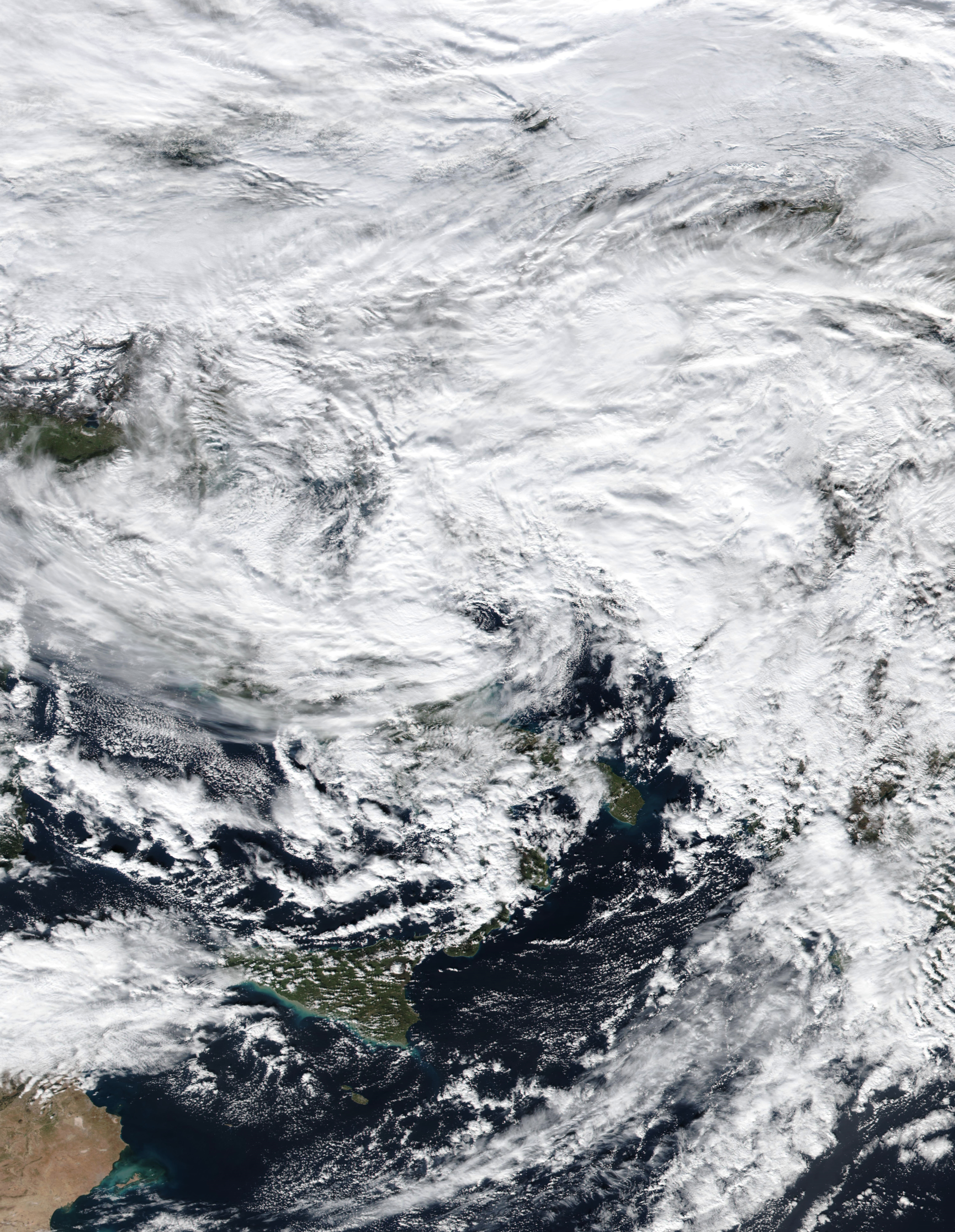
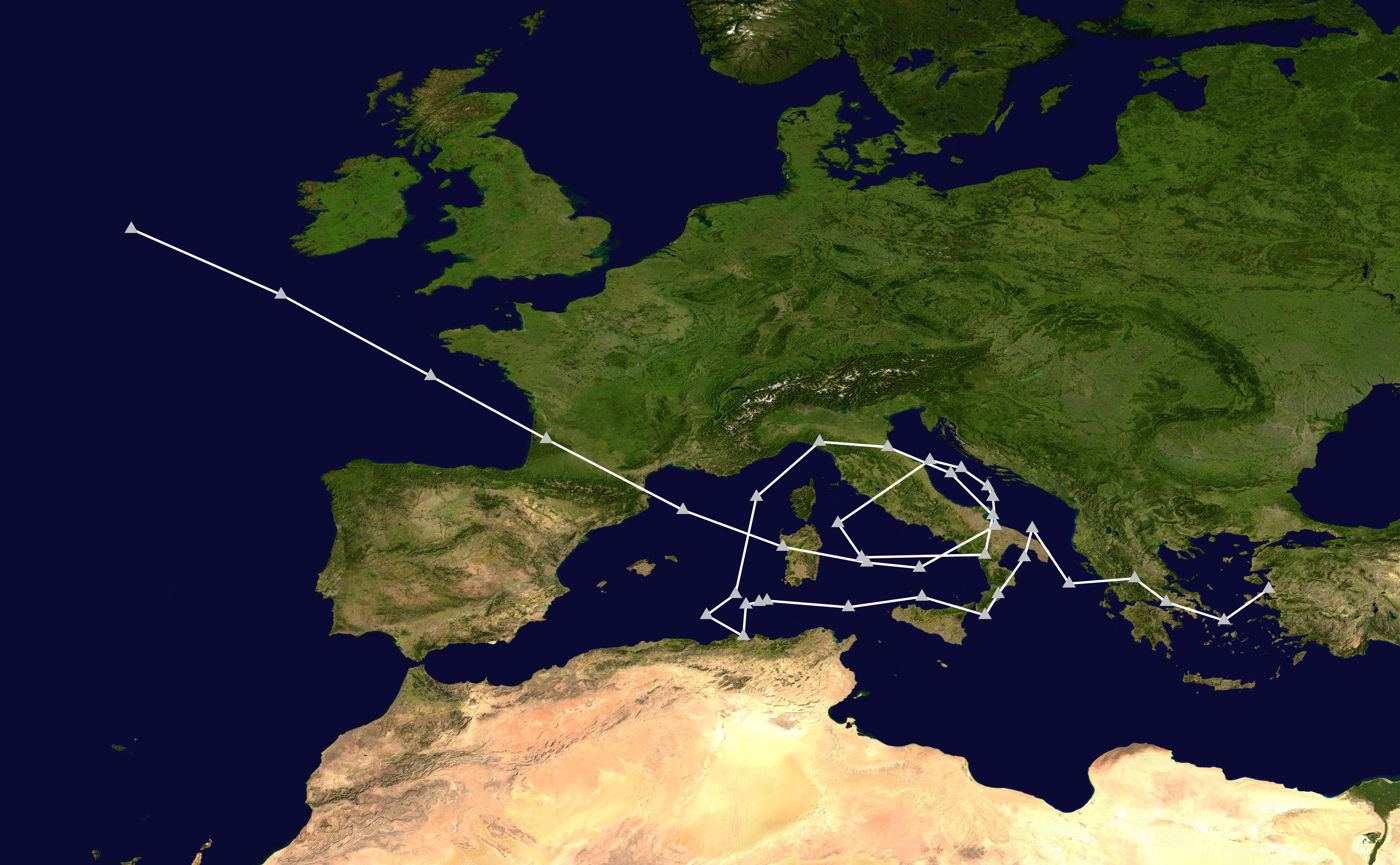
- Duration: 21 January 2023 – 22 January 2023
- Peak intensity: 75 km/h (45 mph) (1-min); 996 hPa (mbar)

Hannelore formed out of a larger extratropical low-pressure system centered over Central Europe in January 2023, briefly becoming a medicane over the Adriatic Sea before making landfall close to Rimini, Italy and dissipating.

=== Medicane Daniel ===
- Tropical storm (SSHWS)
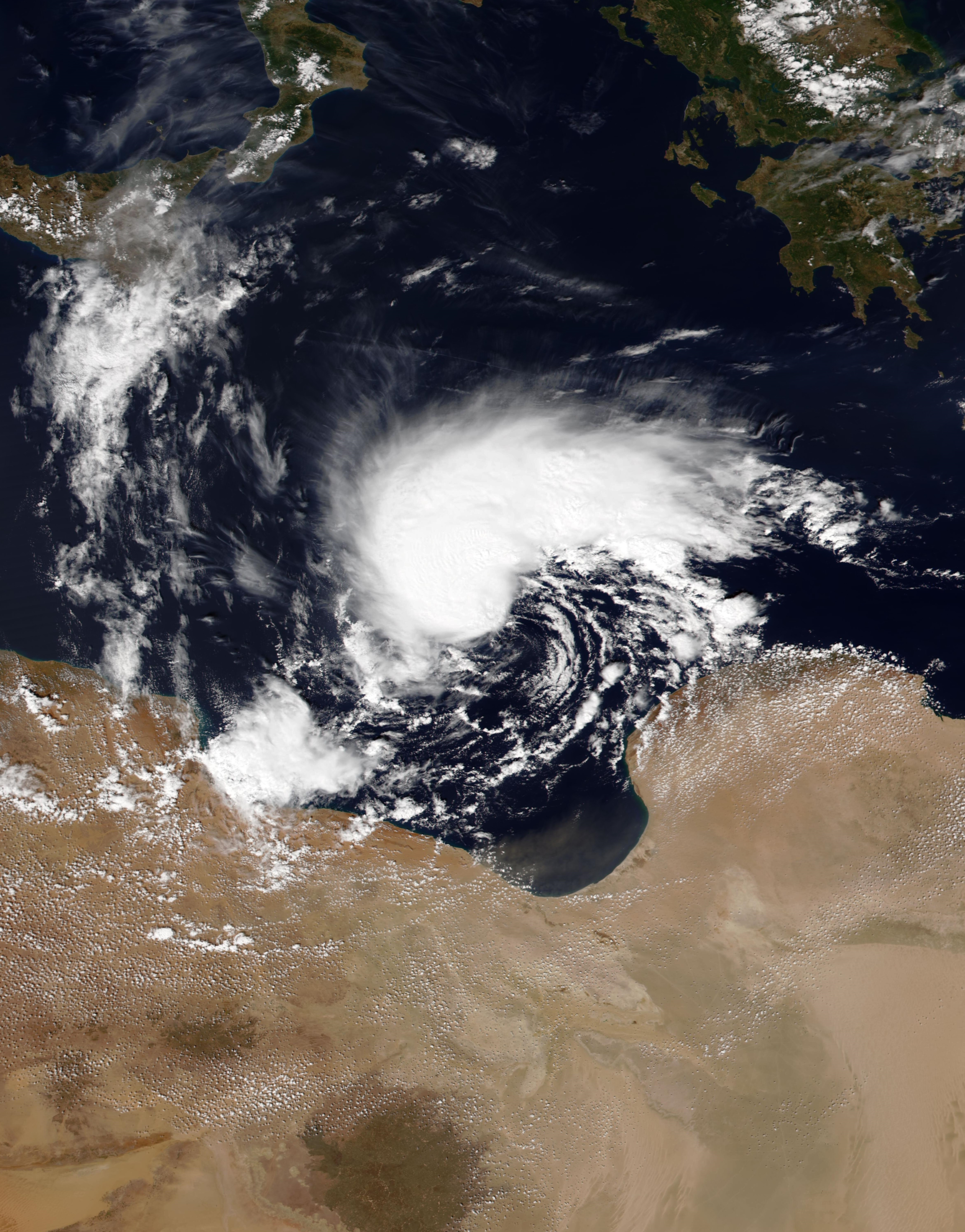
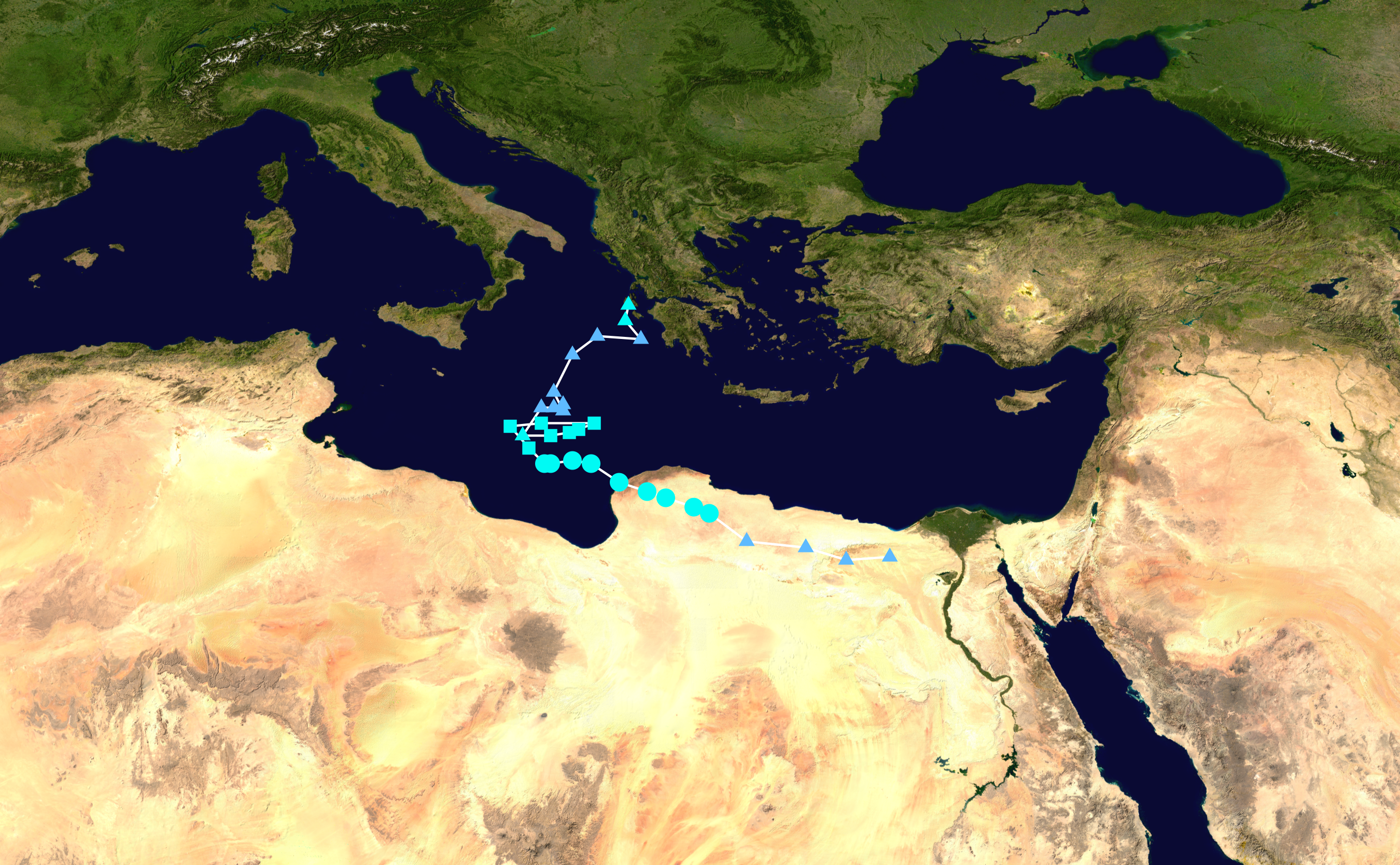
- Duration: 4 September 2023 – 11 September 2023
- Peak intensity: 95 km/h (60 mph) (1-min); 996 hPa (mbar)

Storm Daniel was named by the Hellenic National Meteorological Service on 4 September 2023 and was expected to bring heavy rainfall and heavy winds in Greece, especially in Greece's Thessaly region. On 5 September, the city of Volos was flooded extensively. The village of Zagora recorded 754 mm of rain in 24 hours, a record for Greece. The total rainfall reached 1,096 mm. As of 10 September, sixteen people are confirmed to have died in Greece, seven people are confirmed dead in Turkey, and four people are confirmed to have lost their lives in Bulgaria. Extensive flooding occurred in the plain of Thessaly, in Palamas, Karditsa and the city of Larisa and hundreds civilians were rescued. The flood water covered a region of about 720 square kilometers. In the Halkidiki region, several seaside villages such as Ierissos experienced damage due to the heavy wind. In the seaside village of Toroni in Halkidiki a canoeing woman got swept away by the wind but was later found. The torrential rainfall was a result of a cut-off low. Early on 9 September, the system showed signs of subtropical transition. Later on that same day, it developed a warm core while an ASCAT pass recorded sustained winds of 50 mph (80 km/h) before making landfall near Benghazi, Libya. In Libya, the storm caused flooding in Marj, and the failure of two dams in Derna, and the Jabal al Akhdar district, as well as Benghazi, Susa, and Misrata. The resultant flooding and heavy rain caused the deaths of at least 5,900 people in the country, making it, by a very wide margin, the deadliest Mediterranean tropical-like cyclone on record, prompting a state of emergency to be declared by Libyan authorities.

=== Medicane Avgi ===
- Subtropical storm (SSHWS)
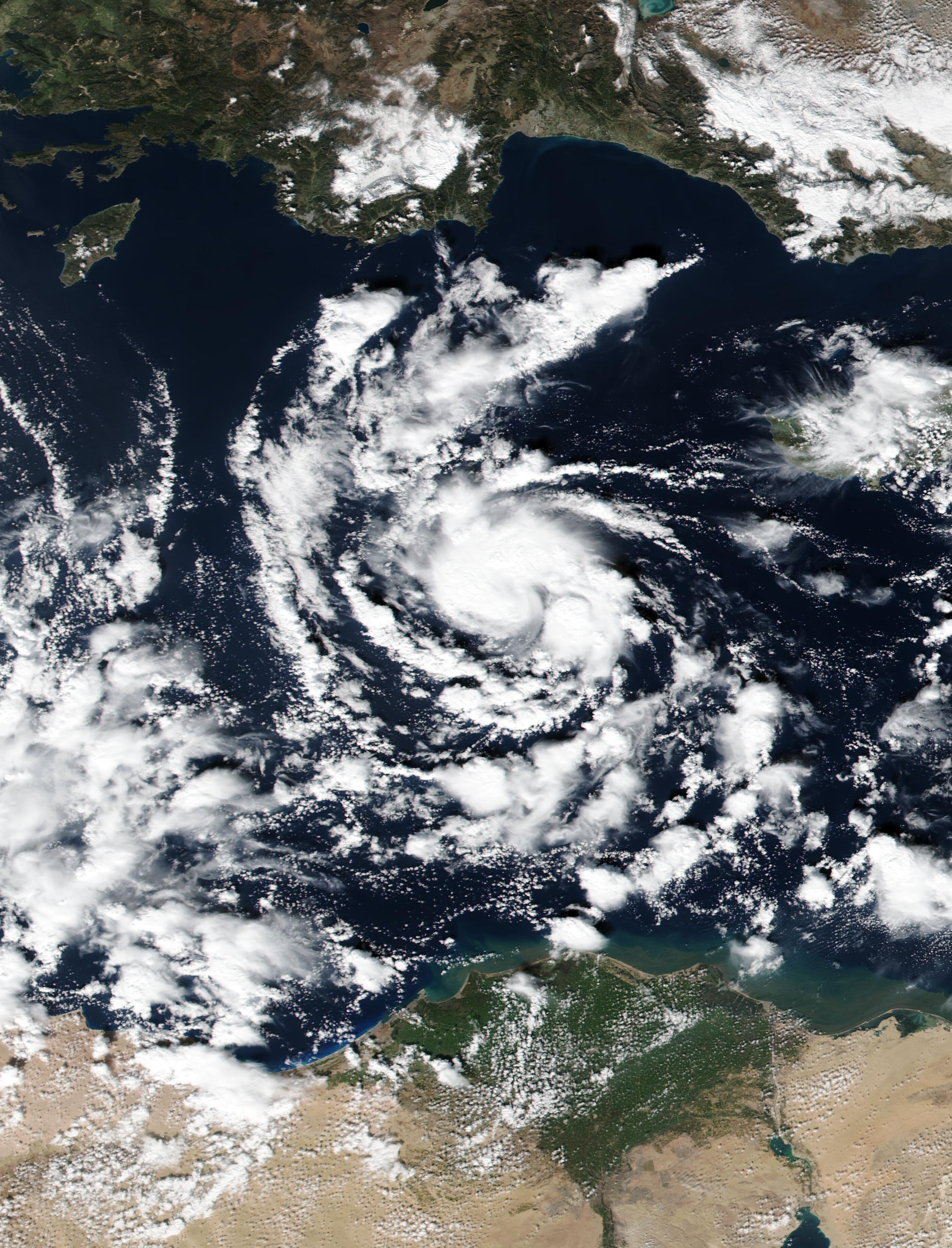
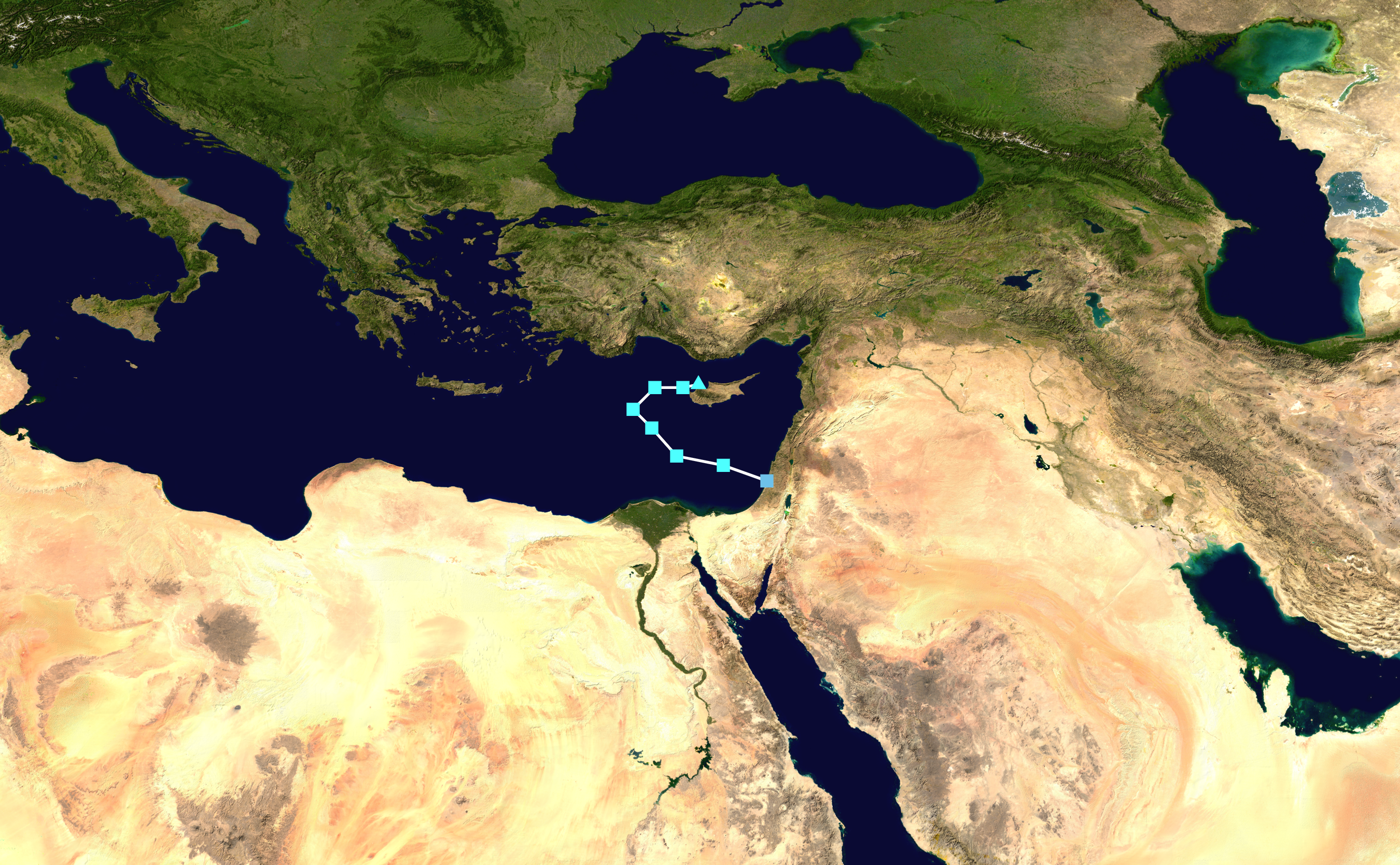
- Duration: 31 January 2024 – 2 February 2024
- Peak intensity: 85 km/h (50 mph) (1-min); 997 hPa (mbar)

Avgi was named by the Hellenic National Meteorological Service on 28 January 2024 for the risk of heavy rain associated with a cold spell. As the storm meandered near Cyprus, it slowly begun to shed its frontal features, eventually transitioning into a subtropical cyclone on 31 January through the support of a zonal trough aloft and an extensive blocking pattern. Avgi began to track towards the southeast as the cloud pattern improved, accelerating towards the Levant, where it made landfall on 2 February.

In Israel, heavy rain prompted the issuance of yellow rain, wind and thunderstorm warnings for northern parts of the country. Meanwhile, orange rain warnings existed for Greece, and an orange thunderstorm warning for Cyprus, including a yellow rain warning for northern Egypt.

=== September 2024 Black Sea medicane ===
- Subtropical depression (SSHWS)
- Duration: 23 September 2024 – 24 September 2024
- Peak intensity: 55 km/h (35 mph) (1-min); 1006 hPa (mbar)

This system developed as an organizing low pressure area over the Black Sea around 23 September 2024 and dissipated the following day. It formed in an environment with unusually warm sea surface temperatures, around or above 26°C in the eastern part of the sea, which contributed to its development. Its pressure was not particularly deep, approximately 1,010 mbar (30 inHg).

The system brought flooding rains to northern Turkey, particularly affecting areas like Trabzon.

=== Medicane Samuel (Jolina) ===
- Subtropical storm (SSHWS)
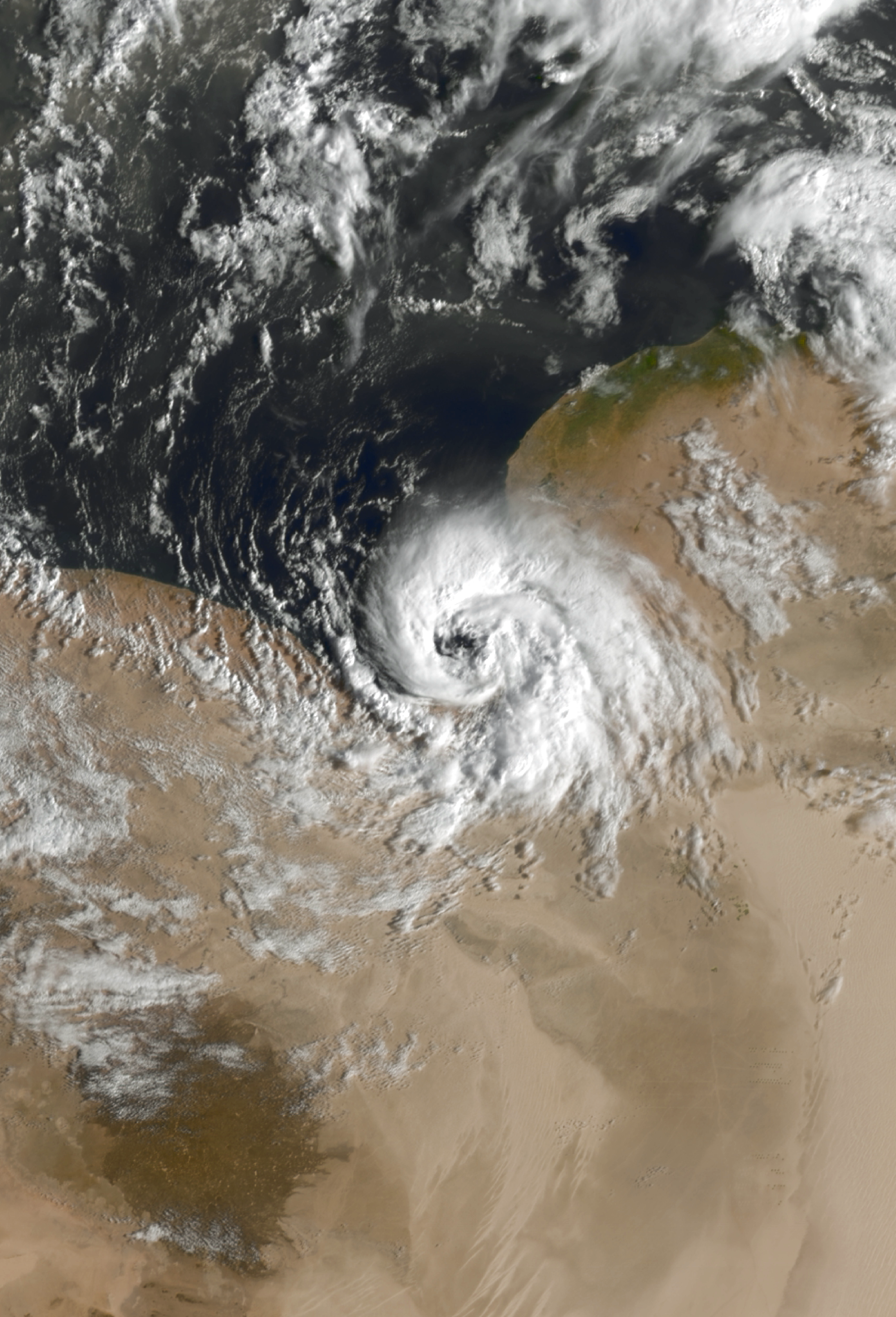
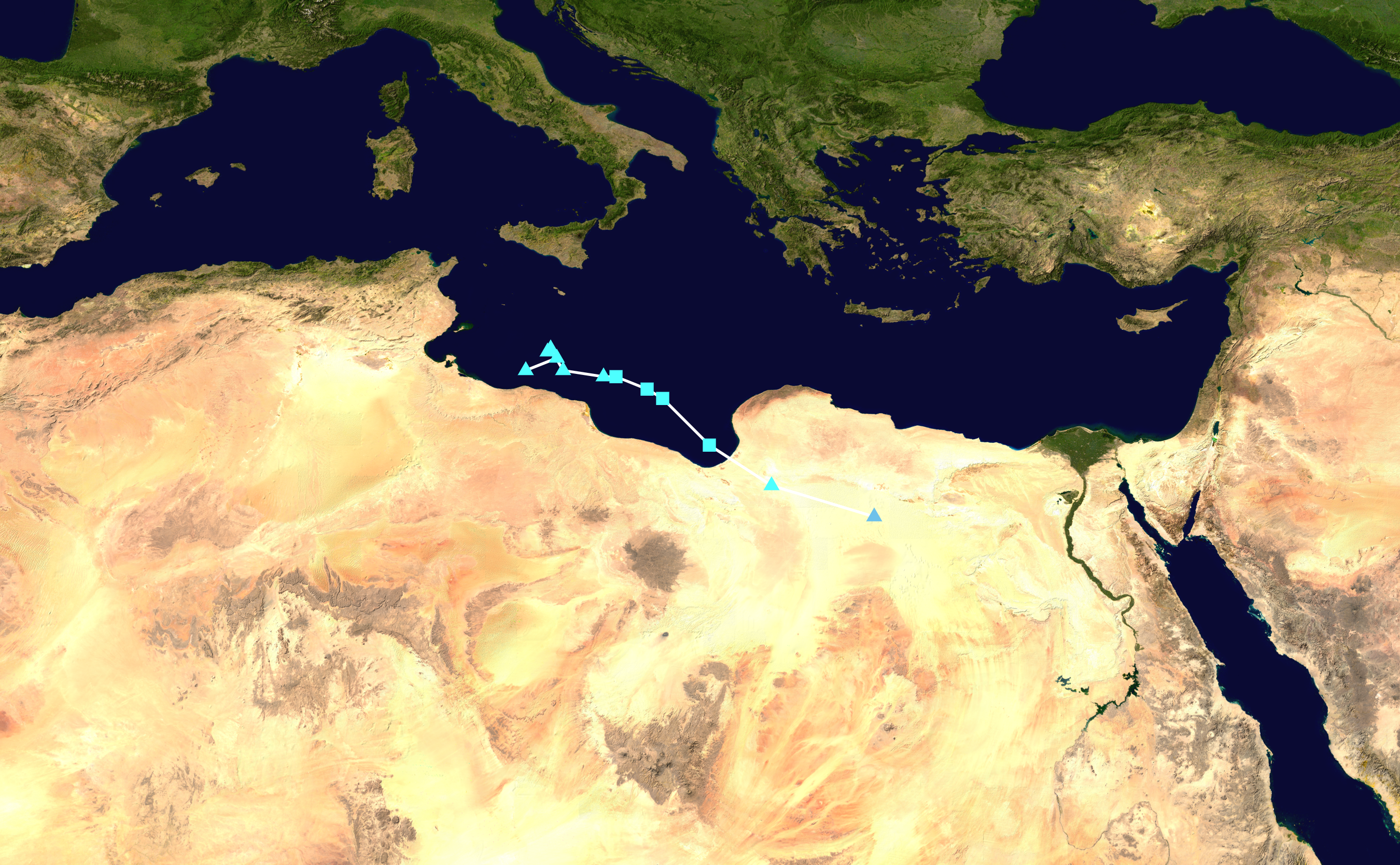
- Duration: 17 March 2026 – 19 March 2026
- Peak intensity: 85 km/h (50 mph) (1-min); 993 hPa (mbar)

The second March 2026 system, Storm Samuel, was named on 15 March 2026 by the National Meteorological Service of Andorra, and was expected to bring strong winds and rough seas across the Iberian Peninsula and the Balearic Islands, causing power outages across states such as Catalonia and Basque Country. Areas north of Barcelona and Girona province reported wind gusts in excess of 160 km/h (99 mph; 86 kn); these impacts caused four people to be injured across Iberia. After impacting the Iberian Peninsula, Samuel entered the Mediterranean Sea where it later received the name Jolina from FUB.

The frontal low transitioned into a rare Mediterranean tropical-like cyclone before making landfall in Libya early on 18 March. The eye-like structure alongside its warm core signature had led some European meteorological agencies to classify Storm Samuel as a medicane. An ASCAT pass recorded 1-minute sustained winds of 75 km/h (47 mph; 40 kn) a day before landfall. The storm dissipated over Egypt early on 19 March.

== Other tropical-like cyclones ==
Numerous other Mediterranean tropical-like cyclones have occurred; as the phenomenon was poorly understood before the turn of the 20th century, many of these were only discovered in re-analysis of historical data, and as such are poorly documented. These less-known systems, and the dates on which they occurred, are noted below.

A study in 2000 revealed five notable and well-developed medicanes. A follow-up study in 2013 revealed several additional storms with their formation days and also additional information on medicanes. A third study, conducted in 2007, revealed additional storms with their formation days. A fourth study from 2013 presented several other cyclones and their days of development. A survey made by EUMETSAT resulted in many more cyclones.

- September 1947
- September 1973
- 18–20 August 1976
- 26 March 1983
- 7 April 1984,
- 29–30 December 1984
- 14–18 December 1985
- January 1991, 5 December 1991
- 21–25 October 1994
- 10–13 December 1996
- 22–27 September 1997, 30–31 October 1997, 5–8 December 1997
- 25–27 January 1998
- 19–21 March 1999, 13 September 1999
- 10 September 2000, 9 October 2000
- 27–28 May 2003, 16–19 September 2003, 27–28 September 2003, 8 October 2003
- 19–21 September 2004, 3–5 November 2004
- August 2005, 15–16 September 2005, 22–23 October 2005, 26–28 October 2005
- 9 August 2006
- 19–23 March 2007 16–18 October 2007, 26 October 2007
- June 2008, August 2008, September 2008, 4 December 2008
- January 2009, May 2009, twice in September 2009, October 2009
- 12–14 October 2010, 2–4 November 2010
- Twice in February 2012, 13–15 April 2012.

== Climatological statistics ==
There have been 100 recognized tropical-like cyclones in the Mediterranean Sea between 1947 and 2021 from the databases of the Laboratory of Climatology and Atmospheric Environment, University of Athens, and METEOSAT. By steady accrual of reported and recognized occurrences of tropical-like cyclones (medicanes), the number count reached at least 92 by 18 March 2026. Unlike most northern hemisphere cyclone seasons, Mediterranean tropical-like cyclone activity peaks between the months of September and January.

List of storms, by month

Month	Number of recorded storms in the Mediterranean Sea
January	10
February	6
March	6
April	2
May	2
June	1
July	1
August	5
September	19
October	18
November	10
December	13
Total	92

The numbers do not necessarily mean that all occurrences of medicanes have been fetched in particular before the end of the 1980s. With the development (and constant improvement) of satellite-based observations, the number count of clearly identified medicanes increased from the 1980s onward. There might be an additional impact from climate change in the frequency of the observed medicanes, but this is not deducible from the data.

List of storms, by decade

Decade	Number of recorded storms in the Mediterranean Sea
1940s	2
1950s	0
1960s	1
1970s	2
1980s	7
1990s	15
2000s	27
2010s	20
2020s	10

== Deadly storms ==
The following is a list of all medicanes that caused deaths.

Name	Year	Number of deaths
Daniel	2023	≥ 5,951
Unnamed	1969	≥ 600
Numa	2017	22
Rolf	2011	12
Blas	2021	9
Apollo	2021	7
Zorbas	2018	≥ 6 (2 missing)
Natalie	2012	6 (34 injured)
Ianos	2020	4 (1 missing)
Qendresa	2014	3
Samuel	2026	1
Unnamed	2026	1

== See also ==
- Outline of tropical cyclones
- List of European tropical cyclones
- List of South Atlantic tropical and subtropical cyclones
