= Hurricane Olga =

Category 1 Atlantic hurricane in 2001

- Hurricane Olga at peak intensity on November 27

Meteorological history
- Formed: November 24, 2001
- Extratropical: December 4, 2001
- Dissipated: December 7, 2001

Category 1 hurricane
- 1-minute sustained (SSHWS/NWS)
- Highest winds: 90 mph (150 km/h)
- Lowest pressure: 973 mbar (hPa); 28.73 inHg

Overall effects
- Fatalities: None
- Areas affected: Bermuda, Bahamas, Cuba, Florida
- IBTrACS
- Part of the 2001 Atlantic hurricane season

Hurricane Olga was the fifteenth named storm and ninth hurricane of the 2001 Atlantic hurricane season. It was notable as it was the largest tropical cyclone by diameter of gale-force winds on record in the Atlantic at the time. Hurricane Olga formed as a subtropical cyclone on November 24. After acquiring tropical characteristics later that day, Olga meandered westward, and eventually reached hurricane status on November 26. Olga peaked as a 90 mph (140 km/h) Category 1 hurricane before the storm turned southwestward and weakening back into a tropical storm. On November 30 it deteriorated further to a tropical depression, although it re-intensified two days later to tropical storm intensity. Olga then dissipated as a tropical cyclone on December 4 east of the Bahamas. Its damaging effects were limited to ships at sea. The cyclone's remnants produced heavy rainfall across the Bahamas and Florida. It was a relatively rare storm to exist in December, which is outside of the normal Atlantic hurricane season.

== Meteorological history ==
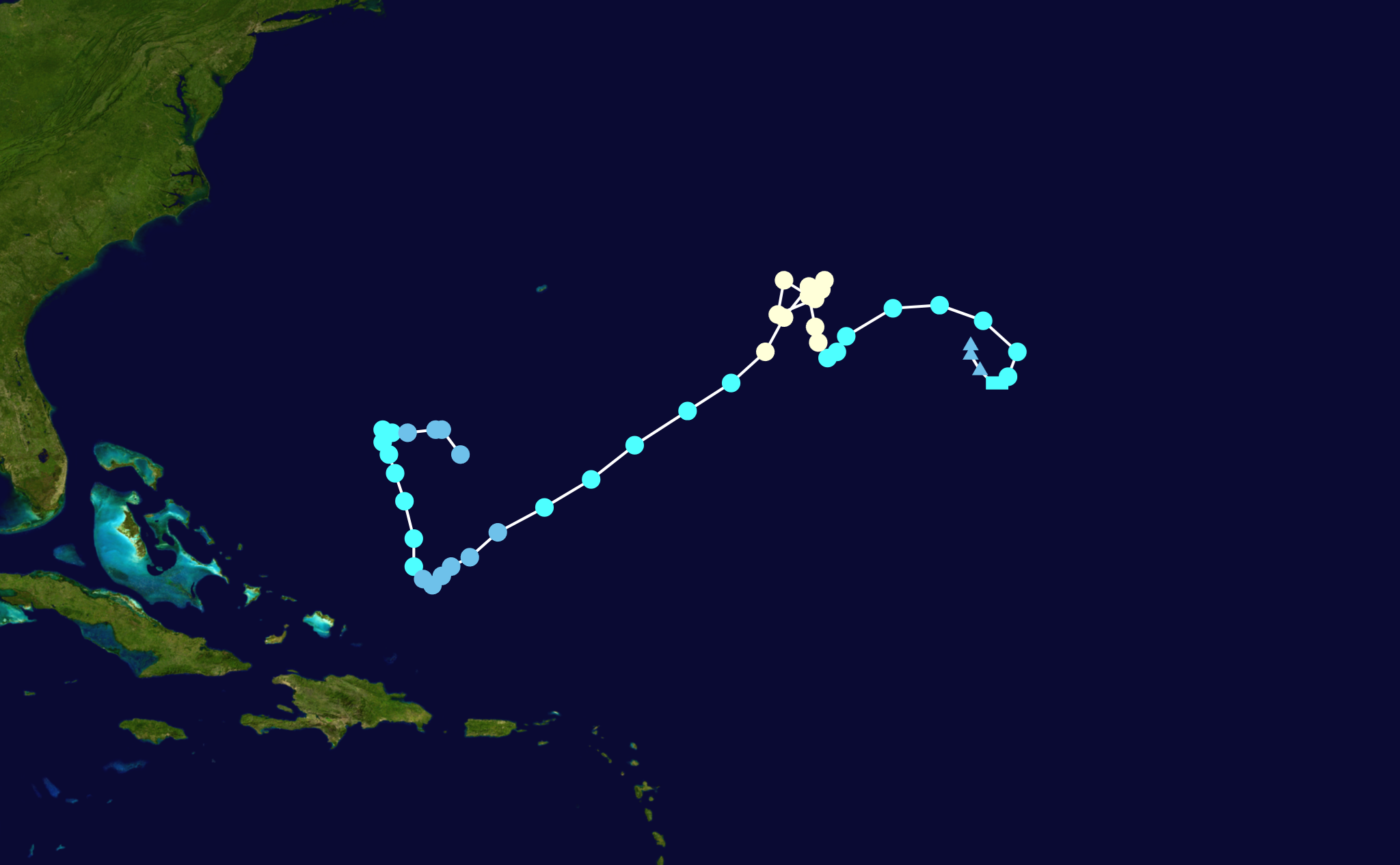
Map plotting the storm's track and intensity, according to the Saffir–Simpson scale Map key Saffir–Simpson scale Tropical depression (≤38 mph, ≤62 km/h) Tropical storm (39–73 mph, 63–118 km/h) Category 1 (74–95 mph, 119–153 km/h) Category 2 (96–110 mph, 154–177 km/h) Category 3 (111–129 mph, 178–208 km/h) Category 4 (130–156 mph, 209–251 km/h) Category 5 (≥157 mph, ≥252 km/h) Unknown Storm type Tropical cyclone Subtropical cyclone Extratropical cyclone, remnant low, tropical disturbance, or monsoon depression

The origins of Hurricane Olga were from the interaction of a cold front and a small weather disturbance in the north Atlantic Ocean, producing an extratropical low east of Bermuda on November 22. The low gradually intensified and acquired subtropical characteristics, developing an area of convection east of the center and accompanied by a large area of gale-force winds. By 00:00 UTC on November 24, the system organized enough to be classified as Subtropical Storm Two, while located about 900 mi (1,400 km) east-southeast of Bermuda. Subsequently, the convection markedly increased and became more concentrated, with hints of an eye feature. Within 12 hours of becoming a subtropical, it is estimated the cyclone transitioned into Tropical Storm Olga; however, it was not purely tropical, due to being positioned beneath an upper-level low. Operationally, the National Hurricane Center (NHC) did not initiate advisories until nine hours later, referring to it as Subtropical Storm Two for two more days.

When advisories first began on Olga, forecasters were uncertain how long the storm would persist, due to the storm's presence within a much larger storm; one hurricane model anticipated an increase in wind shear within 24 hours, which would likely cause quick dissipation. However, the NHC accurately forecasted the storm to remain a cyclone for several days. Olga initially tracked northeastward, followed by a turn to the west due to a building ridge to its north. On November 25, the storm began acquiring more characteristics of a tropical storm, such as detaching from the larger storm and developing more distinct convective rainbands. This was due to decreasing wind shear and continued atmospheric instability, although only marginally warm sea surface temperatures. After turning to the southwest, Olga resumed a northwest motion, and at 1200 UTC on November 26, Olga intensified into a hurricane. By that time, an eye had developed in the center, and the previously large wind field had contracted. Upon attaining hurricane status, Olga was tracking northwestward due to an approaching trough. The eye steadily became better defined as outflow increased, and on November 27, Olga attained peak winds of 90 mph (140 km/h), along with a minimum pressure of 973 mbar (28.73 inHg). While at peak intensity, the hurricane executed a double loop about 455 mi (732 km) east of Bermuda, due to interaction with a larger cyclonic circulation that was isolated from the westerlies.

Largest Atlantic hurricanes By diameter of gale-force winds
Rank	System	Season	Diameter	
Rank	System	Season	mi	km
1	Sandy	2012	1,150	1,850
2	Martin	2022	1,040	1,670
3	Igor	2010	920	1,480
4	Olga	2001	865	1,390
5	Teddy	2020	850	1,370

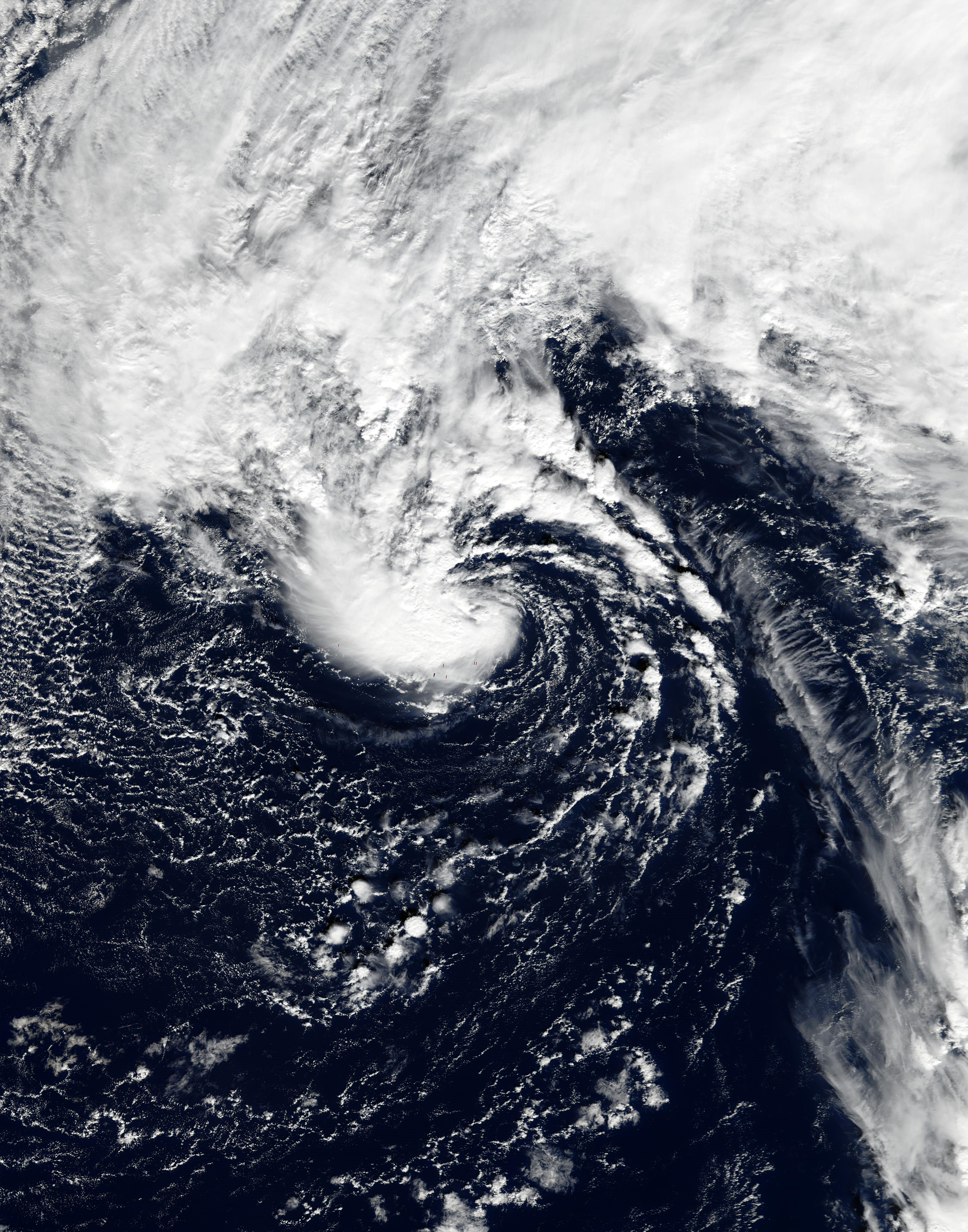
Olga shortly after transitioning into a tropical storm on November 24

On November 28, after finishing the second loop, Olga turned to the southwest due to a building ridge to its northwest. Around the same time, it began a steady weakening trend, due to strong wind shear displacing the convection. The eye became poorly defined as the center became exposed, and on November 29 Olga weakened to tropical storm status. With the thunderstorms rapidly diminishing, the storm weakened quickly, and Olga deteriorated further to a tropical depression on November 30. Forecasters anticipated continued weakening until dissipation, although the cyclone was expected to move over an area of more favorable conditions, including warmer waters and lighter shear. Still existing as a tropical cyclone on December 1, Olga extended the hurricane season beyond its typical boundaries. It continued producing a small area of deep convection, prompting one forecaster to note that "Olga is stubbornly holding on to tropical cyclone status... for now." After reaching a position about 240 mi (390 km) northeast of the Turks and Caicos Islands, the depression turned toward the north after a trough created a weakness in the ridge. After a decrease in wind shear, deep convection redeveloped over the center, and Olga re-intensified into a tropical storm on December 2.

After becoming a tropical storm again, the thunderstorms organized into a rainband about 100 mi (160 km) away from the center, characteristics more typical of a subtropical cyclone. By late on December 2, the structure resembled that of a hurricane with an eye in the center, and although convection was weak, Olga was able to intensify further to winds of 45 mph (72 km/h). At the time, there was uncertainty whether the storm would strengthen further, possibly to near hurricane status, or rapidly weaken. Ultimately, an approaching trough caused weakening by increasing wind shear, while also forcing the storm eastward. On December 4, Olga again weakened to a tropical depression as it lost most of its convection. Later that day, the circulation turned to the southeast as a ridge built to its north, and Olga degenerated into a remnant low pressure area, about 690 mi (1,110 km) east of Nassau, Bahamas. The remnant circulation turned to the south and west, completing a loop and later moving through the Bahamas before dissipating along the north coast of Cuba on December 7.

== Preparations and impact ==
Forecasters at the National Hurricane Center began issuing advisories on Olga on November 24 anticipating that the storm would threaten shipping lanes in the Atlantic. Several ships and boats in the path of Olga reported seas of 12 ft (3.7 m) or higher. One boat, the Manana Tres, reported a barometric pressure of 989 millibars (29.2 inHg) and sustained structural damage.

In Bermuda, the Bermuda Weather Service issued gale warnings and local marine warnings for boats and other small water craft. The approach of Olga also forced cancellation of the World Yacht regatta, but there was little damage on the island. Olga brought winds of 35–45 mph (56–72 km/h) and waves 15–22 ft (4.6–6.7 m) to the island for several days, but there were no reports of any damage. Additionally, just over 2.2 in (56 mm) of precipitation fell on Bermuda on December 3. The hurricane also brought rough seas to the East Coast of the United States, the Bahamas, and as far south and east as the Lesser Antilles. A buoy near Guadeloupe reported 12 ft (3.7 m) waves. In Puerto Rico, large swells impacted the San Juan–Bayamón–Caguas metropolitan area. Minor coastal flooding occurred in the Condado section of San Juan, while Highway 187 became impassable in Piñones. High waves in Florida led to the issuance of a heavy surf advisory from the Jupiter Inlet to Flager Beach. Beaches eroded, threatening the foundations of two homes in Flagler County and a stretch of State Road A1A. Consequently, county officials declared a state of emergency and requested assistance from the state or federal government. However, state emergency officials considered a disaster declaration unnecessary as another one already been in place for the area since Hurricane Gabrielle in September. Swells ranging from 6 to 8 ft (1.8 to 2.4 m) impacted the Outer Banks of North Carolina. The remnants of Olga later produced heavy rainfall across the Bahamas, Cuba, and south Florida.

== See also ==
- Timeline of the 2001 Atlantic hurricane season
- List of Category 1 Atlantic hurricanes
- Hurricane Iris (2001)
