= Hurricane Karen (2001) =

Category 1 Atlantic hurricane in 2001

- Karen shortly before being upgraded to a hurricane on October 13

Meteorological history
- Formed: October 12, 2001
- Dissipated: October 15, 2001

Category 1 hurricane
- 1-minute sustained (SSHWS/NWS)
- Highest winds: 80 mph (130 km/h)
- Lowest pressure: 982 mbar (hPa); 29.00 inHg

Overall effects
- Fatalities: None
- Damage: $1.4 million (2001 USD)
- Areas affected: Bermuda, Atlantic Canada
- IBTrACS
- Part of the 2001 Atlantic hurricane season

Hurricane Karen was a hurricane of non-tropical origin that formed in October of the 2001 Atlantic hurricane season. It developed out of the interaction between a cold front and an upper level trough on October 10 located to the south of Bermuda, and quickly strengthened as an extratropical storm. The storm passed near Bermuda on October 12, producing hurricane-force winds on the island. It then organized, becoming a subtropical cyclone on October 12 and a tropical cyclone on October 13. Karen strengthened to reach 80 mph (130 km/h) winds as a Category 1 hurricane on the Saffir-Simpson Hurricane Scale, and after weakening over cooler waters, it made landfall on Nova Scotia as a tropical storm. It quickly became extratropical.

On Bermuda, winds from the precursor extratropical storm produced moderate damage, primarily to power lines and marine interests. Over 2/3 of the island's power subscribers were left without power during the worst of the storm, and several boats sank or ran aground from the high winds. Damage on Bermuda totaled to over $1.4 million (2001 USD; $1.7 million 2008 USD). In Atlantic Canada, Tropical Storm Karen produced light winds and rain, but caused minimal damage.

== Meteorological history ==
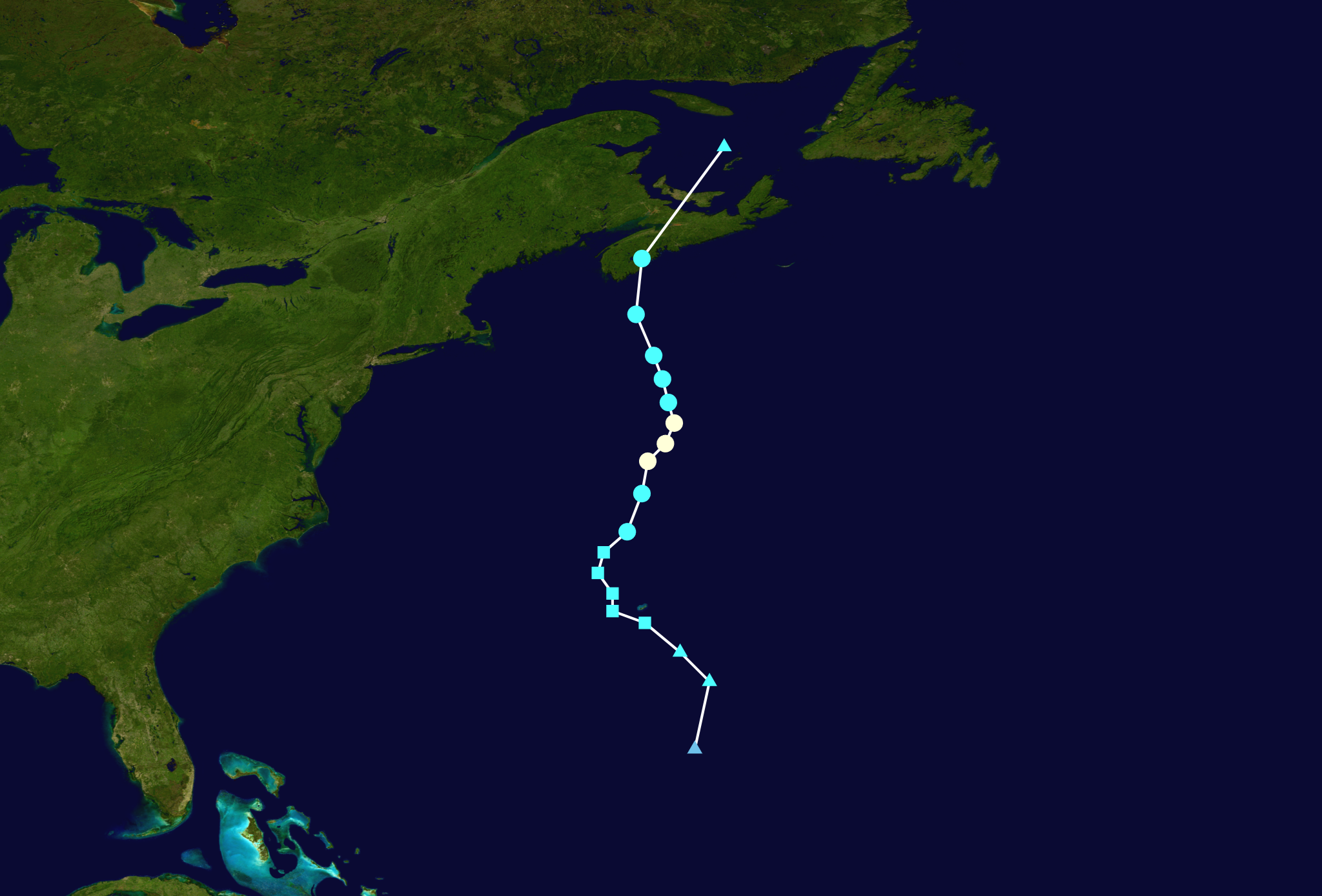
Map plotting the storm's track and intensity, according to the Saffir–Simpson scale Map key Saffir–Simpson scale Tropical depression (≤38 mph, ≤62 km/h) Tropical storm (39–73 mph, 63–118 km/h) Category 1 (74–95 mph, 119–153 km/h) Category 2 (96–110 mph, 154–177 km/h) Category 3 (111–129 mph, 178–208 km/h) Category 4 (130–156 mph, 209–251 km/h) Category 5 (≥157 mph, ≥252 km/h) Unknown Storm type Tropical cyclone Subtropical cyclone Extratropical cyclone, remnant low, tropical disturbance, or monsoon depression

A cold front stalled a couple hundred miles southeast of Bermuda on October 10. During that day, a strong upper-level trough moved southeastward off the southeast coast of the United States. Due to several factors, including upward motion and strong diffluence—the rate at which a fluid moves—the area became baroclinically unstable. This caused the interaction between the trough and the front to develop into an extratropical low about 345 miles (555 km) southeast of Bermuda on October 11. The low moved quickly northward, then northwestward, strengthening quickly due to the instability of the atmosphere. Late on October 11, the system slowed, and the upper-level circulation became aligned with the low-level circulation. The extratropical storm began to develop tropical characteristics late on October 11, including surface temperatures warmer than the surrounding environment, and vertical wind characteristics of a tropical cyclone. Based on its organization, the system developed into Subtropical Storm One early on October 12 while located about 35 miles (56 km) south of Bermuda.

While passing to the south of Bermuda, the subtropical storm maintained winds of 70 mph (110 km/h), with wind gusts on the island surpassing 100 mph (160 km/h). After becoming dissociated from the Westerlies, the system turned northward, and began to develop convection over the center. In addition, the frontal characteristics of the subtropical storm continually weakened. On October 13, based on an Advanced Microwave Sounding Unit observation that stated that a warm core was present throughout the system, the National Hurricane Center designated the system as a tropical storm, and gave it the name Karen. At this point, Karen was located 200 miles (320 km) north of Bermuda. Karen slowly strengthened over the warm waters of the Gulf Stream, and the storm intensified to a hurricane later on October 13. Convection continued to develop, and organized into a ring around the eye as Karen reached its peak intensity of 80 mph (130 km/h) on October 14 while located about 400 miles (640 km) south of Halifax, Nova Scotia.

Tropical Storm Karen shortly after landfall in Nova Scotia on October 15

Karen quickly weakened as it moved over cooler waters, and late on October 14 it degenerated back into a tropical storm as it accelerated northward. Convection gradually decreased, and Karen made landfall on southwestern Nova Scotia with winds of 45 mph (72 km/h) on October 15. Karen retained its tropical characteristics during and after making landfall, based on a research flight out of Halifax intended to study the early stages of extratropical transition. The flight reported arced bands and a warm-core system transitioning into a more typical mid-latitude system. Under the influence of a mid-latitude system, the storm turned sharply to the northeast, and after losing the remaining of its convection it became extratropical shortly after landfall. Continuing northward, the remnant low quickly weakened, and dissipated as it was absorbed by a larger extratropical storm over the Gulf of Saint Lawrence.

== Preparations ==
On October 10, as the precursor extratropical storm was forming, the Bermuda Weather Service issued a gale and later a storm warning for the island, expecting winds of 50 to 60 mph (80 to 97 km/h). Several radio interviews and television stations issued information on the expected storm. Many residents believed they were insufficiently warned, though it is acknowledged that emergency managers and citizens pay less attention to gale warnings than they do for tropical cyclone warnings. On October 12, as the storm was passing to the south of the island, officials closed all schools and government offices. Many private businesses closed as well.

At the time of Karen's landfall, gale warnings were issued for coastal waters, while inland wind warnings were in effect for Cape Breton. In addition, heavy rainfall warnings were issued for large portions of Nova Scotia including Halifax, southeastern New Brunswick, Fundy National Park, and Prince Edward Island.

== Impact ==
=== Bermuda ===
Subtropical Storm One passing near Bermuda on October 12

While passing to the south of the island, the tight pressure gradient between the precursor extratropical storm and high pressures resulted in strong winds on the island, including sustained winds of hurricane status at Fort George. Gusts on the island officially peaked at 100 mph (160 km/h) at Devonshire. A cruise ship anchored at harbor reported a wind gust of 118 mph (190 km/h), though it could have been caused by a downdraft. The storm also dropped moderate rainfall of just over 3 inches (76 mm), resulting in minor flooding of streets. Because the storm developed quickly, wave-induced beach erosion was minor.

The strong winds left considerable tree and powerline damage. At the worst of the storm, 23,000 of the island's 30,000 power subscribers were without electricity. Damage to power lines totaled to $385,000 (2001 USD, $468,700 2008 USD). The strong winds also caused considerable damage to vegetation. Three cruise ships weathered the storm at St. George's Harbour, where the powerful winds ripped out a post and snapped a mooring line, leaving a ship drifting in the harbor. One crew member was minorly injured. Over a dozen boats broke free from their moorings, resulting in them running aground or sinking. In all, 87 boats were affected to some degree, with marine damage totaling to about $665,000 (2001 USD, $809,600 2008 USD). The winds also caused minor damage to 175 properties on the island, primarily to houses. Damage to houses amounted to about $425,000 (2001 USD, $517,400 2008 USD). Overall damage was moderate, totaling to about $1.4 million (2001 USD). A few storm-related injuries occurred.

=== Canada ===
Tropical Storm Karen produced light to moderate winds across Atlantic Canada, peaking at 47 mph (76 km/h) with a gust of 64 mph (103 km/h) in Cape George in Antigonish County, Nova Scotia, along with a 26 mph (42 km/h) report in Charlottetown, Prince Edward Island. Rainbands in the storm dropped light rainfall of up to 1.8 inches (46 mm) in Yarmouth, Nova Scotia and 1.4 inches (36 mm) in Saint John, New Brunswick, most of which fell in a short amount of time. Skewed to the left side of the transitioning storm, the rainfall was beneficial for the drought-stricken areas of Nova Scotia and New Brunswick. Due to the fast-moving nature of the storm, though, most areas reported only around half an inch of rain. A buoy in Halifax Harbour reported wave heights of up to 16.7 feet (5.1 m), causing breaking waves at docks white caps along the ocean. Damage in Canada was minor due to the storm, limited to an uprooted tree in New Glasgow, Nova Scotia and several other trees with damaged branches.

== See also ==
- Other storms of the same name
- List of Bermuda hurricanes
- Timeline of the 2001 Atlantic hurricane season
