= Tropical Storm Chantal (2001) =

Atlantic tropical storm in 2001

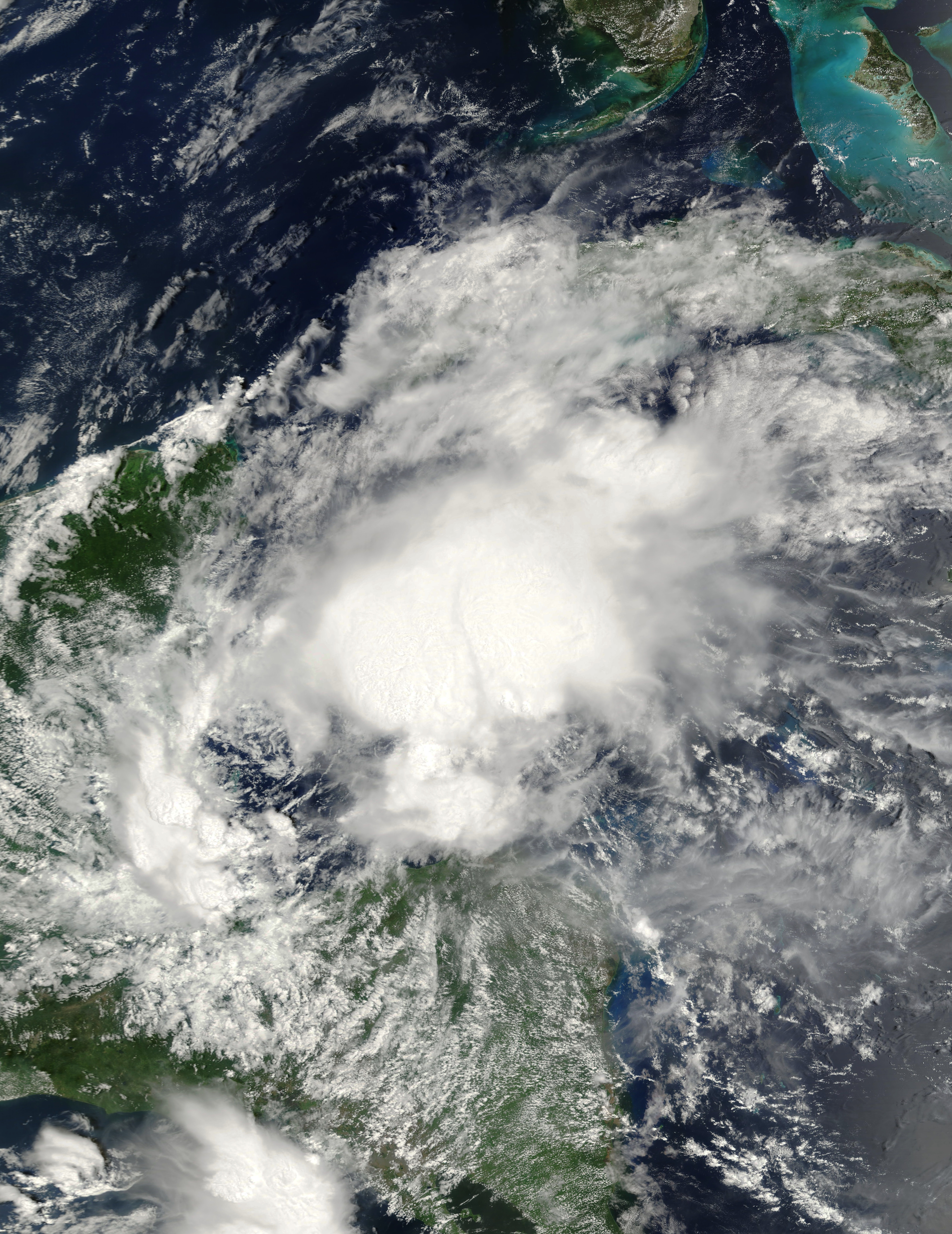
- Tropical Storm Chantal shortly after peak intensity east of the Yucatán Peninsula on August 20

Meteorological history
- Formed: August 14, 2001
- Dissipated: August 22, 2001

Tropical storm
- 1-minute sustained (SSHWS/NWS)
- Highest winds: 70 mph (110 km/h)
- Lowest pressure: 997 mbar (hPa); 29.44 inHg

Overall effects
- Fatalities: 2 indirect
- Damage: $4 million (2001 USD)
- Areas affected: Windward Islands, Jamaica, Belize, Mexico
- IBTrACS
- Part of the 2001 Atlantic hurricane season

Tropical Storm Chantal (/ʃɑːnˈtɑːl/ shahn-TAHL) was a North Atlantic tropical cyclone that moved across the Caribbean Sea in August 2001. The fourth depression and third named storm of the 2001 Atlantic hurricane season, Chantal developed from a tropical wave on August 14 in the tropical Atlantic Ocean. It tracked rapidly westward for much of its duration, and after degenerating into a tropical wave, it passed through the Windward Islands. Chantal reached a peak intensity of 70 mph (110 km/h) twice in the Caribbean Sea, and each time it was anticipated to attain hurricane status; however, wind shear and later land interaction prevented strengthening to hurricane status. On August 21 Chantal moved ashore near the border of Mexico and Belize, before dissipating on the next day.

In the Windward Islands, lightning caused two indirect deaths in Trinidad. Chantal dropped light to moderate rainfall across its path, most significantly in Quintana Roo in Mexico where it caused widespread mudslides. Damage in Belize totaled $4 million (2001 USD; $7.27 million 2026 USD), due to the combined impact of high waves, moderate winds, and rainfall. Overall damage was minor.

== Meteorological history ==
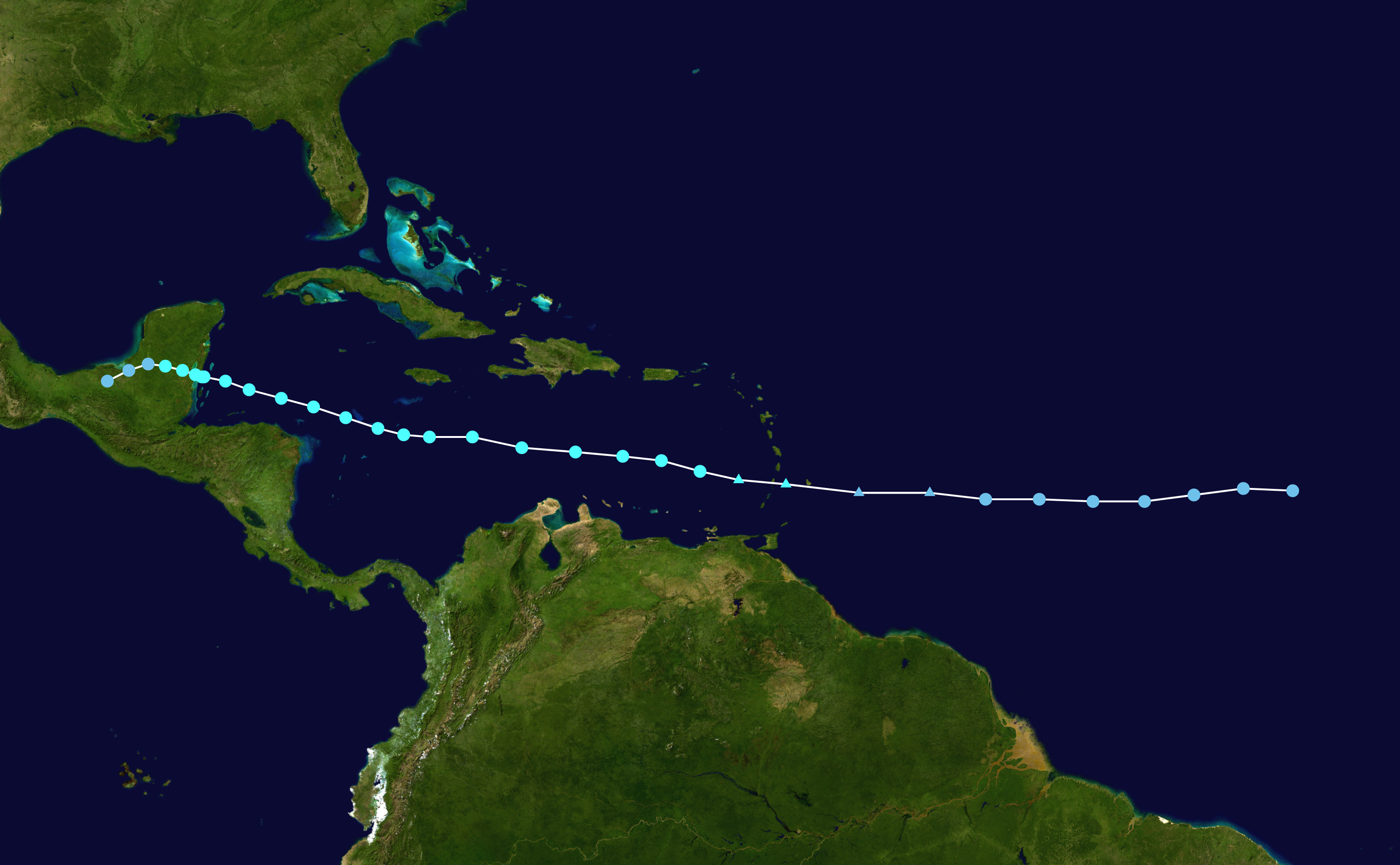
Map plotting the storm's track and intensity, according to the Saffir–Simpson scale Map key Saffir–Simpson scale Tropical depression (≤38 mph, ≤62 km/h) Tropical storm (39–73 mph, 63–118 km/h) Category 1 (74–95 mph, 119–153 km/h) Category 2 (96–110 mph, 154–177 km/h) Category 3 (111–129 mph, 178–208 km/h) Category 4 (130–156 mph, 209–251 km/h) Category 5 (≥157 mph, ≥252 km/h) Unknown Storm type Tropical cyclone Subtropical cyclone Extratropical cyclone, remnant low, tropical disturbance, or monsoon depression

A tropical wave moved off the coast of Africa on August 11. Associated deep convection quickly decreased after tracking westward through the tropical Atlantic Ocean, although by August 13 a broad low pressure area and closed circulation developed along the wave. Environmental conditions favored tropical development, and the system gradually became better organized, although convection was initially limited near the center. On August 14, convection increased northwest of the center and became sufficiently well-organized for the system to be considered a tropical depression; at the time, it was located about 1500 miles (2400 km) east of the southern Windward Islands.

Situated to the south of a strong subtropical ridge, the depression tracked rapidly westward. With easterly wind shear, the structure was initially disorganized, although the system was forecast to attain tropical storm status within 48 hours of developing, due to anticipated favorable conditions. One computer model predicted the depression would reach winds of around 115 miles per hour (185 km/h) by four days after development. Banding features increased while the satellite presentation continued to improve, and at 1200 UTC on August 16 the depression was upgraded to Tropical Storm Chantal about 370 miles (595 km) east of Barbados. At the same time however, a QuikSCAT pass suggested the system did not contain a low-level circulation, and in post-season analysis, the National Hurricane Center estimated the system degenerated into a tropical wave rather than attain tropical storm status. This was confirmed by a Hurricane Hunters flight into the system.

Despite lacking a closed circulation, the overall structure remained well-organized, and with a favorable upper-level environment the possibility of regeneration into a tropical cyclone was noted. Early on August 17, the remnants of Chantal passed over the Windward Islands with winds of tropical storm force. After entering the Caribbean Sea, the system slowed while its convective pattern expanded and became more symmetric. Hurricane Hunters confirmed that a small circulation developed about 290 miles (265 km) south of Saint Croix, and accordingly the system developed into a tropical storm. Forecasters described the upper-level environment as "ideal for [a] tropical cyclone to intensify", with winds of 80 miles per hour (130 km/h) forecast within a few days. The cyclone was predicted to maintain a west-northwestward track toward the northwestern Caribbean and Gulf of Mexico. On August 18, the winds increased to 65 miles per hour (105 km/h), although an increase in forward motion caused the low-level circulation to become separated from the deep convection. The storm again decelerated on August 19, allowing re-organization and for Chantal to attain peak sustained winds of 70 miles per hour (110 km/h) about 185 miles (295 km) south of Kingston, Jamaica.

After reaching peak winds, Tropical Storm Chantal became disorganized while the center became ill-defined and situated to the west-southwest of the main area of convection; this was due to unfavorable upper-level winds, although computer models continued to forecast a more favorable upper-level environment. By early on August 20, Hurricane Hunters reported several low-level circulations embedded within a large low pressure area. Later that day, wind shear decreased when the storm moved into the Gulf of Honduras. Chantal became much better organized, again reaching peak winds of 70 miles per hour (110 km/h) before making landfall early on August 21 near the border of Mexico and Belize. Initially, the storm was forecast to cross the Yucatán Peninsula and Bay of Campeche and make a second landfall in the state of Veracruz. Chantal slowly weakened over land while moving slowly across northern Belize. Convection decreased markedly late on August 21, and early the next day Chantal weakened to tropical depression status. The upper- and middle-level circulations turned to the northeast while the low-level circulation turned to the west-southwest further inland. Weakening continued, and late on August 22 Chantal dissipated over the Mexican state of Tabasco.

== Preparations ==
Tropical Storm Chantal approaching the Yucatán Peninsula on August 20

The National Hurricane Center issued a tropical storm watch for eastern Caribbean, including island countries like Barbados, St. Vincent, and Saint Lucia on August 15. The following day the watches were changed to warnings, since forecasters predicted that the system would reach tropical storm status. Additional watches and warnings were also issued for the rest of Windward Islands.

Late on August 17, the government of Jamaica issued a hurricane watch for the island, due to anticipated strengthening. The next day, it was upgraded to a hurricane warning briefly before being amended to a tropical storm warning, due to the storm's weakening in the central Caribbean. In the country, officials advised fishermen to return to harbor, while some flights into Norman Manley International Airport were canceled. A tropical storm warning was also issued for the Cayman Islands, where an emergency shelter was opened. There, tourists were recommended to temporarily leave the islands.

About 50 hours before landfall, a tropical storm watch was issued for Belize and the eastern Yucatán Peninsula, and about 12 hours later it was upgraded to a hurricane watch. When the lack of significant intensification became apparent, a tropical storm warning was added for much of the Yucatán Peninsula and later for a portion of the Mexican coast along the Bay of Campeche. As the storm approached, nearly 2,500 people in vulnerable areas of eastern Mexico evacuated to safer areas. About 8,000 people evacuated in Belize, primarily on offshore islands. The government of Belize opened its emergency operation center and evacuated several hospitals. About 250 airline flights were canceled, and some cruise ship paths were diverted to safer locations.

== Impact ==
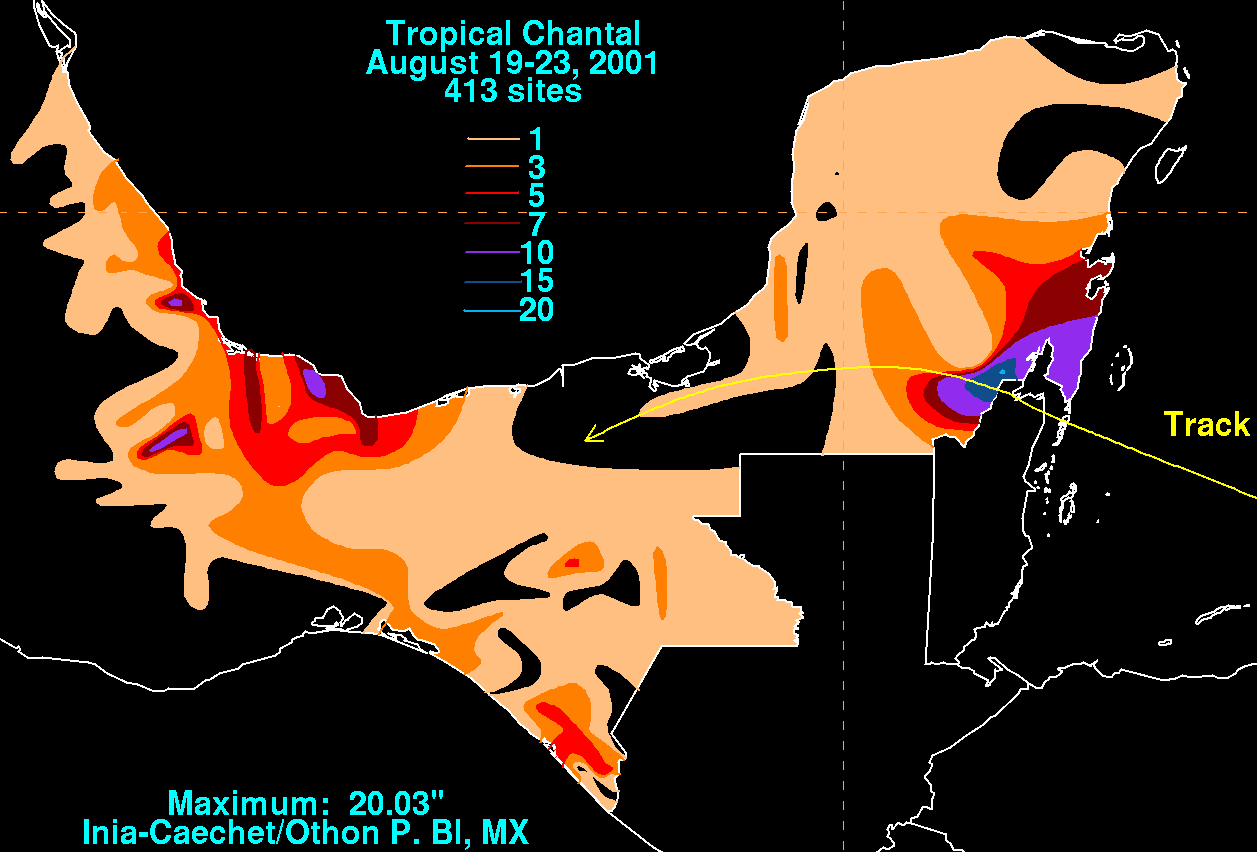
Mexico rainfall from Chantal

As a strong tropical wave, Chantal passed through the Windward Islands. The island of Martinique reported sustained winds of 39 miles per hour (63 km/h) with gusts to 56 miles per hour (91 km/h). On August 16, lightning from the system killed two brothers in southern Trinidad. Also on the island, heavy rainfall caused flooding and road washouts.

While tracking across the eastern Caribbean Sea, the outer rainbands of Chantal produced light to moderate rainfall across Puerto Rico and the United States Virgin Islands. In Puerto Rico, the highest rainfall total was 2.4 inches (61 mm) in Rio Piedras. Passing to the south of Jamaica, the storm produced light rainfall and gusty winds. The outer rainbands also affected the Cayman Islands.

In Belize, the tropical storm produced a wind gust of 71 miles per hour (115 km/h) in Caye Caulker, although stronger winds were possible in a convective band to the north. Moderate rainfall was reported across the country, peaking at 9.81 inches (249 mm) at Towerhill station. Along the coast, high waves damaged seawalls and piers. Further inland, the combination of winds and flooding caused agriculture and infrastructure damage; overall damage in the country totaled $4 million (2001 USD; $7.27 million 2026 USD).

Tropical Storm Chantal also produced gusty winds in the Yucatán Peninsula, peaking at 62 miles per hour (100 km/h) in Chetumal, Quintana Roo. Dropping moderate to heavy rainfall along its path, a station near Chetumal reported a peak total of 20.03 inches (509 mm). The remnants of Chantal also produced rainfall along the Bay of Campeche coast. The storm resulted in downed trees and power lines, as well as damaged buildings. Heavy rainfall led to mudslides across Quintana Roo, leaving some areas isolated. Initially, there were reports of two missing fishermen off the southeastern coast, although it was not later confirmed. Overall damage was minor.

== See also ==
- Other tropical cyclones named Chantal
- Timeline of the 2001 Atlantic hurricane season
- Hurricane Ernesto (2012)
- Hurricane Earl (2016)
- Hurricane Franklin (2017)
