= Timeline of the 2001 Atlantic hurricane season =

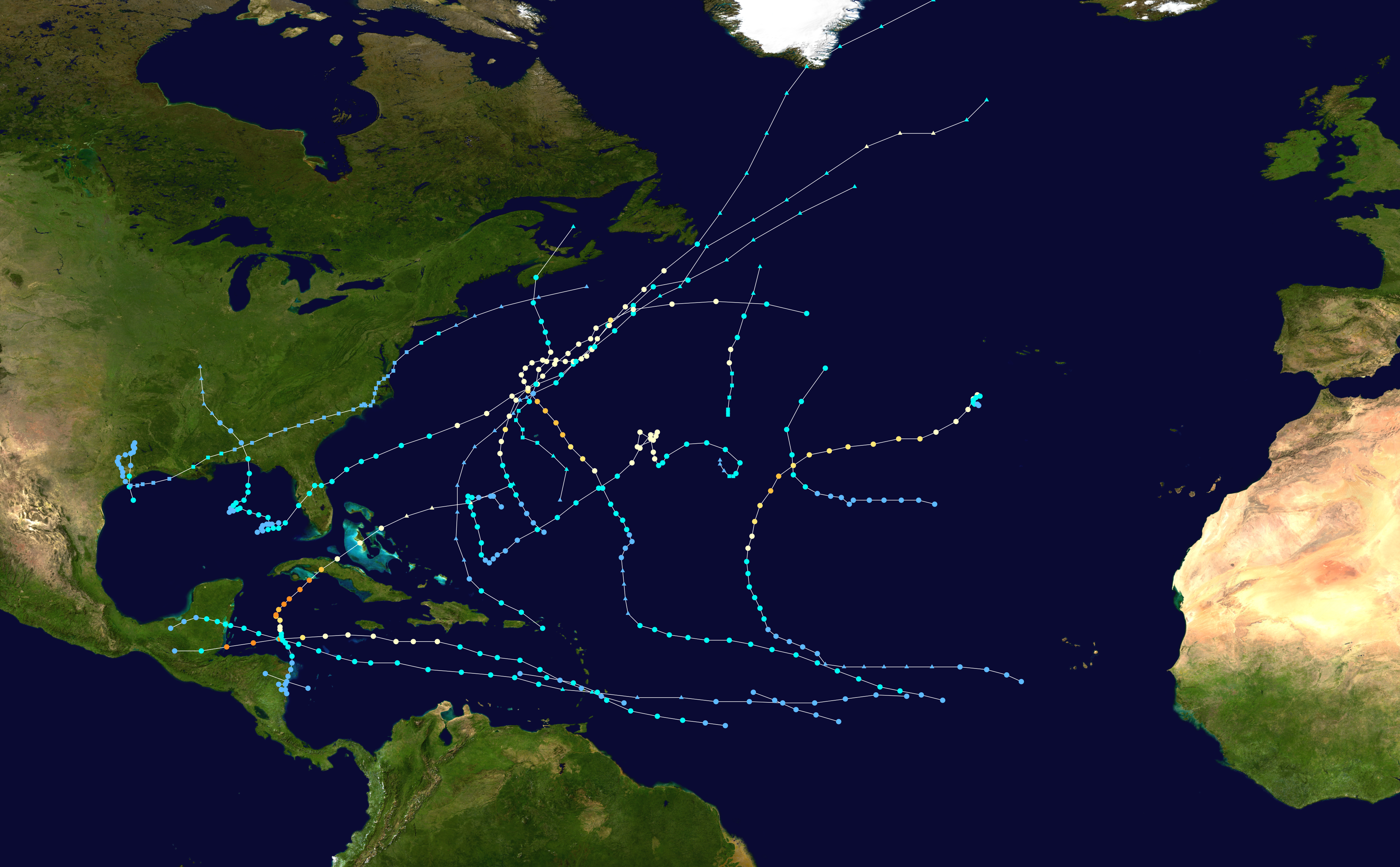
- Season summary map

Season boundaries
- First system formed: June 5, 2001
- Last system dissipated: December 4, 2001

Strongest system
- By maximum sustained winds: Iris
  - Maximum winds: 145 mph (230 km/h) (1-minute sustained)
  - Lowest pressure: 948 mbar (hPa; 27.99 inHg)
- By central pressure: Michelle
  - Maximum winds: 140 mph (220 km/h) (1-minute sustained)
  - Lowest pressure: 933 mbar (hPa; 27.55 inHg)

Longest lasting system
- Name: Erin
- Duration: 13.5 days
Storm articles
- Tropical Storm Allison (2001)
- Tropical Storm Barry (2001)
- Tropical Storm Chantal (2001)
- Tropical Storm Dean (2001)
- Hurricane Erin (2001)
- Hurricane Gabrielle (2001)
- Hurricane Iris
- Hurricane Karen (2001)
- Hurricane Michelle
- Hurricane Olga

The 2001 Atlantic hurricane season was an above-average Atlantic hurricane season in which fifteen named storms formed. (Note: An average season, as defined by the National Oceanic and Atmospheric Administration, has twelve tropical storms, six hurricanes and two major hurricanes.) The season officially began on June 1 and ended on November 30, dates that conventionally delimit the period of each year when most tropical cyclones form in the Atlantic basin. The season's first tropical cyclone, Tropical Storm Allison, formed on June 5 while the season's final system, Hurricane Olga, dissipated on December 6. The season produced seventeen tropical depressions, of which fifteen intensified into tropical storms, nine became hurricanes, and four strengthened into major hurricanes. (Note: A major hurricane is a storm that ranks as Category 3 or higher on the Saffir–Simpson hurricane wind scale.)

This timeline documents tropical cyclone formations, strengthening, weakening, landfalls, extratropical transitions, and dissipations during the season. It includes information that was not released throughout the season, meaning that data from post-storm reviews by the National Hurricane Center, such as a storm that was not initially warned upon, has been included.

The time stamp for each event is first stated using Coordinated Universal Time (UTC), the 24-hour clock where 00:00 = midnight UTC. The NHC uses both UTC and the time zone where the center of the tropical cyclone is currently located. The time zones utilized (east to west) prior to 2020 were: Atlantic, Eastern, and Central. In this timeline, the respective area time is included in parentheses. Additionally, figures for maximum sustained winds and position estimates are rounded to the nearest 5 units (miles, or kilometers), following National Hurricane Center practice. Direct wind observations are rounded to the nearest whole number. Atmospheric pressures are listed to the nearest millibar and nearest hundredth of an inch of mercury.

== Timeline ==
=== June ===
June 1

- The 2001 Atlantic hurricane season officially begins.

June 5

- 12:00 UTC (7:00 a.m. CDT) – Tropical Storm Allison develops from an area of low pressure about 120 mi (195 km) south of Galveston, Texas.
- 18:00 UTC (1:00 p.m. CDT) – Tropical Storm Allison attains peak winds of 60 mph (95 km/h) roughly 30 mi (50 km) south of Freeport, Texas.
- 2100 UTC (4:00 p.m. CDT) – Tropical Storm Allison makes landfall near Freeport, Texas, with winds of 50 mph (85 km/h).

Tropical Storm Allison near peak intensity on June 5, 2001

June 6

- 06:00 UTC (1:00 a.m. CDT) – Tropical Storm Allison weakens to a tropical depression approximately 25 mi (40 km) northeast of Houston, Texas.

June 10

- 00:00 UTC (7:00 p.m. CDT, June 9) – Tropical Depression Allison transitions into a subtropical depression about 25 mi (40 km) south-southeast of Freeport, Texas.

June 11

- 02:00 UTC (9:00 p.m. CDT, June 10) – Subtropical Depression Allison makes a second and final landfall near Morgan City, Louisiana, with winds of 35 mph (55 km/h).
- 06:00 UTC (1:00 a.m. CDT) – Subtropical Depression Allison intensifies into a subtropical storm roughly 25 mi (40 km) west of New Orleans, Louisiana.
- 12:00 UTC (7:00 a.m. CDT) – Subtropical Storm Allison attains a minimum barometric pressure of 1000 mbar (hPa; 29.53 inHg) approximately 20 mi (30 km) north-northeast of Picayune, Mississippi.

June 12

- 00:00 UTC (7:00 p.m. CDT, June 11) – Subtropical Storm Allison weakens to a subtropical depression about 20 mi (30 km) north of Atmore, Alabama.

June 17

- 12:00 UTC (7:00 a.m. CDT) – Subtropical Depression Allison re-intensifies into a subtropical storm roughly 55 mi (90 km) east of Atlantic City, New Jersey.

June 18

- 00:00 UTC (7:00 p.m. CDT, June 17) – Subtropical Storm Allison transitions to an extratropical cyclone approximately 55 mi (90 km) southeast of Block Island, Rhode Island.

June 19

- 06:00 UTC (2:00 a.m. AST) – The remnants of Allison dissipate southeast of Nova Scotia.

Storm path of Tropical Depression Two

=== July ===
July 11

- 18:00 UTC (2:00 p.m. AST) – Tropical Depression Two develops from an area of low pressure about 1,150 mi (1,850 km) east of the Windward Islands.

July 12

- 00:00 UTC (8:00 p.m. AST, July 11) – Tropical Depression Two attains its peak intensity with maximum sustained winds of 30 mph (45 km/h) and a minimum barometric pressure of 1010 mbar (hPa; 29.82 inHg) roughly 1,070 mi (1,720 km) east of the Windward Islands.

July 13

- 00:00 UTC (8:00 p.m. AST, July 11) – Tropical Depression Two dissipates approximately 690 mi (1,110 km) east of the Windward Islands.

Tropical Storm Barry on August 5, 2001

=== August ===
August 2

- 12:00 UTC (8:00 a.m. EDT) – Tropical Depression Three develops from an area of low pressure about 200 mi (320 km) west-northwest of Key West, Florida.
- 18:00 UTC (2:00 p.m. EDT) – Tropical Depression Three intensifies into Tropical Storm Barry roughly 185 mi (300 km) west-southwest of Cape Coral, Florida.

August 4

- 00:00 UTC (8:00 p.m. EDT, August 3) – Tropical Storm Barry weakens to a tropical depression approximately 275 mi (445 km) southeast of New Orleans, Louisiana.
- 18:00 UTC (2:00 p.m. EDT) – Tropical Depression Barry re-intensifies into Tropical Storm Barry about 250 mi (400 km) southeast of New Orleans, Louisiana.

August 5

- 12:00 UTC (8:00 a.m. EDT) – Tropical Storm Barry attains a minimum barometric pressure of 990 mbar (hPa; 29.23 inHg) roughly 150 mi (240 km) south-southwest of Panama City, Florida.
- 18:00 UTC (2:00 p.m. EDT) – Tropical Storm Barry attains peak winds of 70 mph (110 km/h) approximately 115 mi (185 km) southwest of Panama City, Florida.

August 6

- 05:00 UTC (1:00 a.m. EDT) – Tropical Storm Barry makes landfall at Santa Rosa Beach, Florida, with winds of 70 mph (110 km/h).
- 12:00 UTC (7:00 a.m. CDT) – Tropical Storm Barry weakens to a tropical depression for a second time about 15 mi (25 km) west of Greenville, Alabama.

August 7

- 06:00 UTC (1:00 a.m. CDT) – Tropical Depression Barry degenerates into a non-convective remnant area of low pressure roughly 95 mi (155 km) southeast of Memphis, Tennessee.

Chantal after making landfall on the Yucatán Peninsula

August 8

- 12:00 UTC (7:00 a.m. CDT) – The remnants of Barry dissipate over southeastern Missouri.

August 14

- 18:00 UTC (2:00 p.m. AST) – Tropical Depression Four develops from an area of low pressure approximately 1,495 mi (2,405 km) east of the southern Windward Islands.

August 16

- 12:00 UTC (8:00 a.m. AST) – Tropical Depression Four degenerates into a tropical wave about 375 mi (605 km) east of the southern Windward Islands.

August 17

- 12:00 UTC (8:00 a.m. AST) – The remnants of Tropical Depression Four regenerate into Tropical Storm Chantal, skipping tropical depression status, roughly 275 mi (445 km) south of Saint Croix.

August 19

- 06:00 UTC (1:00 a.m. CDT) – Tropical Storm Chantal attains its peak intensity with maximum sustained winds of 70 mph (110 km/h) and a minimum barometric pressure of 997 mbar (hPa; 29.44 inHg) approximately 200 mi (320 km) south-southwest of Kingston, Jamaica.

August 21

- 02:00 UTC (9:00 p.m. CDT, August 2) – Tropical Storm Chantal makes landfall near the Mexico–Belize border, with winds of 70 mph (110 km/h).

Tropical Storm Dean near peak intensity on August 27

August 22

- 00:00 UTC (7:00 p.m. CDT, August 21) – Tropical Storm Chantal weakens to a tropical depression about 80 mi (130 km) south-southeast of Campeche City, Mexico.
- 12:00 UTC (8:00 a.m. AST) – Tropical Storm Dean develops from an area of low pressure about 20 mi (30 km) east-northeast of Saint Croix.
- 18:00 UTC (1:00 p.m. CDT) – Tropical Depression Chantal dissipates over the Mexican state of Tabasco.

August 23

- 12:00 UTC (8:00 a.m. AST) – Tropical Storm Dean weakens to a tropical depression roughly 85 mi (140 km) east-northeast of Cockburn Town, Turks and Caicos Islands.
- 18:00 UTC (2:00 p.m. AST) – Tropical Depression Dean degenerates into a tropical wave approximately 125 mi (200 km) north-northeast of Cockburn Town, Turks and Caicos Islands.

August 26

- 18:00 UTC (2:00 p.m. AST) – The remnants of Dean regenerate into a tropical depression about 220 mi (355 km) north of Bermuda.

August 27

- 00:00 UTC (8:00 p.m. AST, August 26) – Tropical Depression Dean re-intensifies into a tropical storm roughly 290 mi (465 km) north-northeast of Bermuda.
- 18:00 UTC (2:00 p.m. AST) – Tropical Storm Dean attains its peak intensity with maximum sustained winds of 70 mph (110 km/h) and a minimum barometric pressure of 994 mbar (hPa; 29.35 inHg) approximately 350 mi (565 km) southeast of Halifax, Nova Scotia.

August 28

- 18:00 UTC (2:00 p.m. AST) – Tropical Storm Dean transitions into an extratropical cyclone 285 mi (460 km) east-southeast of Saint-Pierre, Saint Pierre and Miquelon.

August 29

- 18:00 UTC (2:00 p.m. AST) – The extratropical remnants of Dean are absorbed within a larger extratropical low over the North Atlantic.

Hurricane Erin at peak intensity on September 9

=== September ===
September 1

- 18:00 UTC (2:00 p.m. AST) – Tropical Depression Six develops from an area of low pressure roughly 690 mi (1,110 km) west-southwest of Cabo Verde.

September 2

- 06:00 UTC (2:00 a.m. AST) – Tropical Depression Six intensifies into Tropical Storm Erin approximately 865 mi (1,390 km) west-southwest of Cabo Verde.

September 5

- 18:00 UTC (2:00 p.m. AST) – Tropical Storm Erin degenerates into a non-convective remnant area of low pressure about 285 mi (460 km) northeast of Antigua and Barbuda.

September 6

- 18:00 UTC (2:00 p.m. AST) – The remnants of Tropical Storm Erin regenerate into a tropical depression roughly 550 mi (890 km) northeast of the northern Leeward Islands.

September 7

- 12:00 UTC (8:00 a.m. AST) – Tropical Depression Seven develops from an area of low pressure roughly 415 mi (670 km) southwest of Cabo Verde.
- 18:00 UTC (2:00 p.m. AST) – Tropical Depression Erin re-intensifies into a tropical storm approximately 635 mi (1,020 km) north-northeast of the northern Leeward Islands.

September 8

- 18:00 UTC (2:00 p.m. AST) – Tropical Depression Seven degenerates into a tropical wave roughly 750 mi (1,205 km) west-southwest of Cabo Verde.

September 9

- 00:00 UTC (8:00 p.m. AST, September 8) – Tropical Storm Erin intensifies into a Category 1 hurricane approximately 315 mi (505 km) southeast of Bermuda.
- 06:00 UTC (2:00 a.m. AST) – Hurricane Erin intensifies into a Category 2 hurricane about 235 mi (380 km) southeast of Bermuda.
- 18:00 UTC (2:00 p.m. AST) – Hurricane Erin intensifies into a Category 3 hurricane and reaches its peak intensity with winds of 120 mph (195 km/h) and a minimum barometric pressure of 968 mbar (hPa; 28.59 inHg) roughly 120 mi (195 km) east of Bermuda.

September 10

- 06:00 UTC (2:00 a.m. AST) – The remnants of Tropical Depression Seven regenerate into a tropical depression about 1,275 mi (2,050 km) west of Cabo Verde.
- 18:00 UTC (2:00 p.m. AST) – Hurricane Erin weakens to a Category 2 hurricane about 240 mi (385 km) north of Bermuda.

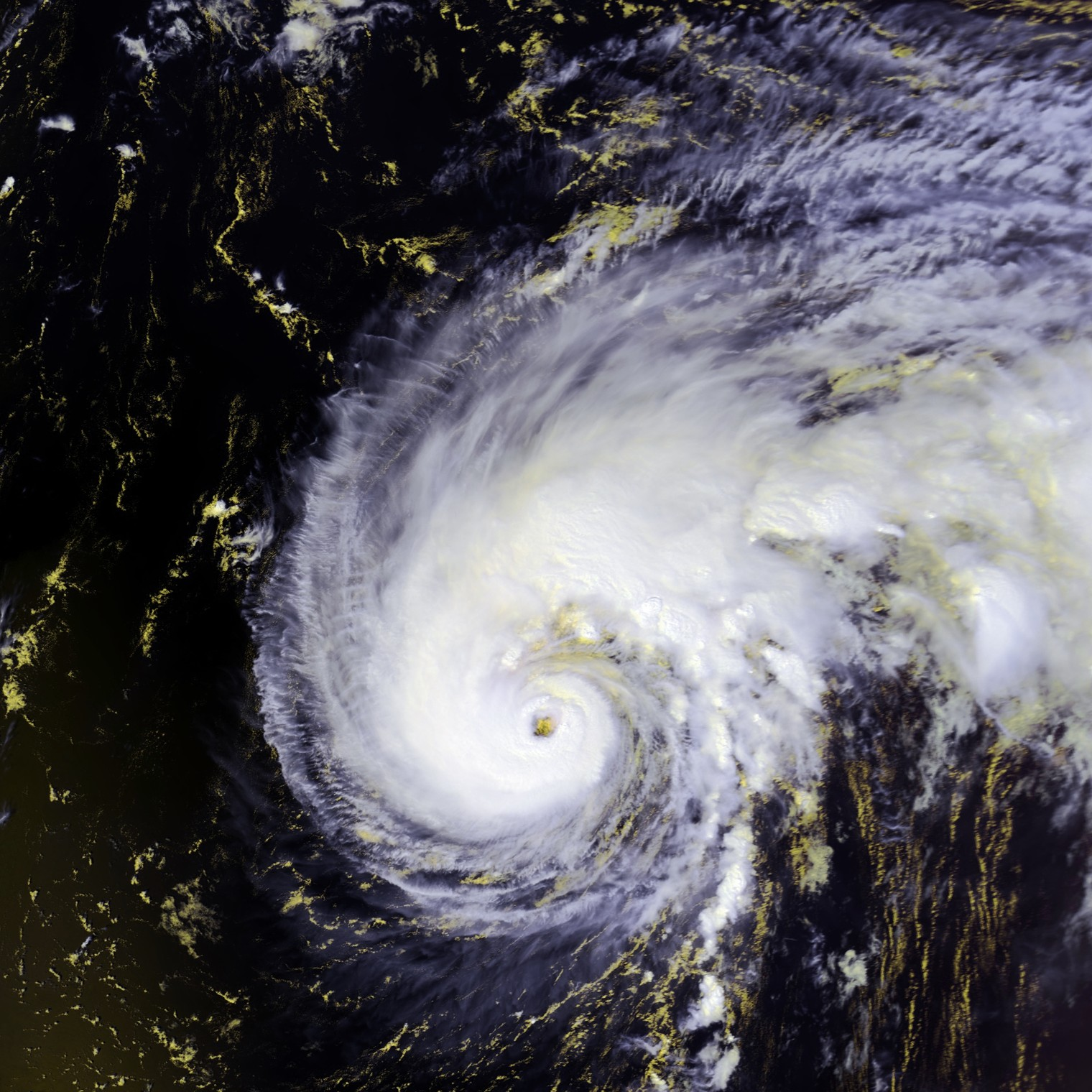
Hurricane Felix on the cusp of becoming a major hurricane

September 11

- 00:00 UTC (8:00 p.m. AST, September 10) – Hurricane Erin weakens to a Category 1 hurricane roughly 290 mi (465 km) north-northwest of Bermuda.
- 12:00 UTC (8:00 a.m. AST) – Tropical Depression Seven intensifies into Tropical Storm Felix about 1,555 mi (2,505 km) west-northwest of Cabo Verde.
- 18:00 UTC (2:00 p.m. EDT) – Tropical Depression Eight develops from an area of low pressure approximately 145 mi (230 km) southwest of Cape Coral, Florida.

September 13

- 00:00 UTC (8:00 p.m. AST, September 12) – Tropical Storm Felix intensifies into a Category 1 hurricane roughly 1,690 mi (2,720 km) northwest of Cabo Verde.
- 12:00 UTC (8:00 a.m. AST) – Hurricane Felix intensifies into a Category 2 hurricane approximately 1,715 mi (2,760 km) northwest of Cabo Verde.
- 12:00 UTC (8:00 a.m. EDT) – Tropical Depression Eight intensifies into Tropical Storm Gabrielle about 205 mi (330 km) southwest of Cape Coral, Florida.

September 14

- 00:00 UTC (8:00 p.m. AST, September 13) – Hurricane Felix intensifies into a Category 3 hurricane and reaches its peak intensity with winds of 115 mph (185 km/h) and a minimum barometric pressure of 962 mbar (hPa; 28.41 inHg) roughly 1,610 mi (2,590 km) southwest of the Azores.
- 12:00 UTC (8:00 a.m. AST) – Hurricane Felix weakens to a Category 2 hurricane approximately 1,030 mi (1,660 km) southwest of the Azores.

September 15

- 00:00 UTC (8:00 p.m. AST, September 14) – Hurricane Erin weakens to a tropical storm about 20 mi (30 km) east-northeast of Cape Race, Newfoundland.
- 06:00 UTC (2:00 a.m. AST) – Tropical Storm Erin transitions into an extratropical cyclone roughly 125 mi (200 km) north-northeast of St. John's, Newfoundland and Labrador.

Hurricane Gabrielle at peak intensity on September 17

September 16

- 06:00 UTC (2:00 a.m. AST) – Hurricane Felix weakens to a Category 1 hurricane approximately 490 mi (790 km) south of the Azores.

September 17

- 00:00 UTC (8:00 p.m. AST, September 16) – Tropical Storm Gabrielle intensifies into a Category 1 hurricane about 345 mi (555 km) west of Bermuda.
- 06:00 UTC (2:00 a.m. AST) – The extratropical remnants of Erin merge with a larger extratropical low over eastern Greenland.
- 12:00 UTC (8:00 a.m. AST) – Hurricane Felix weakens to a tropical storm roughly 405 mi (650 km) southwest of the Azores.
- 12:00 UTC (8:00 a.m. AST) – Hurricane Gabrielle attains its peak winds of 80 mph (130 km/h) about 230 mi (370 km) northwest of Bermuda.

September 18

- 00:00 UTC (8:00 p.m. AST, September 17) – Hurricane Gabrielle weakens to a tropical storm roughly 335 mi (540 km) north-northeast of Bermuda.
- 18:00 UTC (2:00 p.m. AST) – Tropical Storm Felix weakens to a tropical depression approximately 310 mi (500 km) south of the Azores.

September 19

- 00:00 UTC (8:00 p.m. AST, September 18) – Tropical Storm Gabrielle attains its minimum barometric pressure of 975 mbar (hPa; 28.80 inHg) about 415 mi (670 km) southwest of Cape Race, Newfoundland.
- 06:00 UTC (2:00 a.m. AST) – Tropical Depression Felix dissipates roughly 460 mi (740 km) southwest of the Azores.
- 06:00 UTC (2:00 a.m. AST) – Tropical Storm Gabrielle transitions into an extratropical cyclone approximately 285 mi (460 km) south-southwest of Cape Race, Newfoundland.
- 18:00 UTC (2:00 p.m. EDT) – Tropical Depression Nine develops from an area of low pressure about 60 mi (95 km) north-northwest of San Andrés.
- 21:00 UTC (5:00 p.m. EDT) – Tropical Depression Nine attains its peak intensity with maximum sustained winds of 35 mph (55 km/h) and a minimum barometric pressure of 1005 mbar (hPa; 29.68 inHg) roughly 100 mi (160 km) northwest of San Andrés.

Storm path of Tropical Depression Nine

September 20

- 00:00 UTC (8:00 p.m. EDT, September 19) – Tropical Depression Nine makes landfall near Puerto Cabezas, Nicaragua, with winds of 35 mph (55 km/h).
- 12:00 UTC (8:00 a.m. EDT) – Tropical Depression Nine dissipates over the mountains of Central America.

September 21

- 12:00 UTC (8:00 a.m. AST) – Tropical Depression Ten develops from an area of low pressure approximately 490 mi (790 km) south of Bermuda.

September 22

- 00:00 UTC (8:00 p.m. AST, September 21) – The extratropical remnants of Gabrielle merge with another extratropical cyclone over the far northern Atlantic.
- 12:00 UTC (8:00 a.m. AST) – Tropical Depression Ten intensifies into Tropical Storm Humberto about 315 mi (505 km) south-southwest of Bermuda.

September 23

- 12:00 UTC (8:00 a.m. AST) – Tropical Storm Humberto intensifies into a Category 1 hurricane roughly 175 mi (280 km) west-southwest of Bermuda.

September 24

- 00:00 UTC (8:00 p.m. AST, September 23) – Hurricane Humberto intensifies into a Category 2 hurricane approximately 135 mi (215 km) west of Bermuda.
- 06:00 UTC (2:00 a.m. AST) – Hurricane Humberto weakens to a Category 1 hurricane about 155 mi (250 km) northwest of Bermuda.

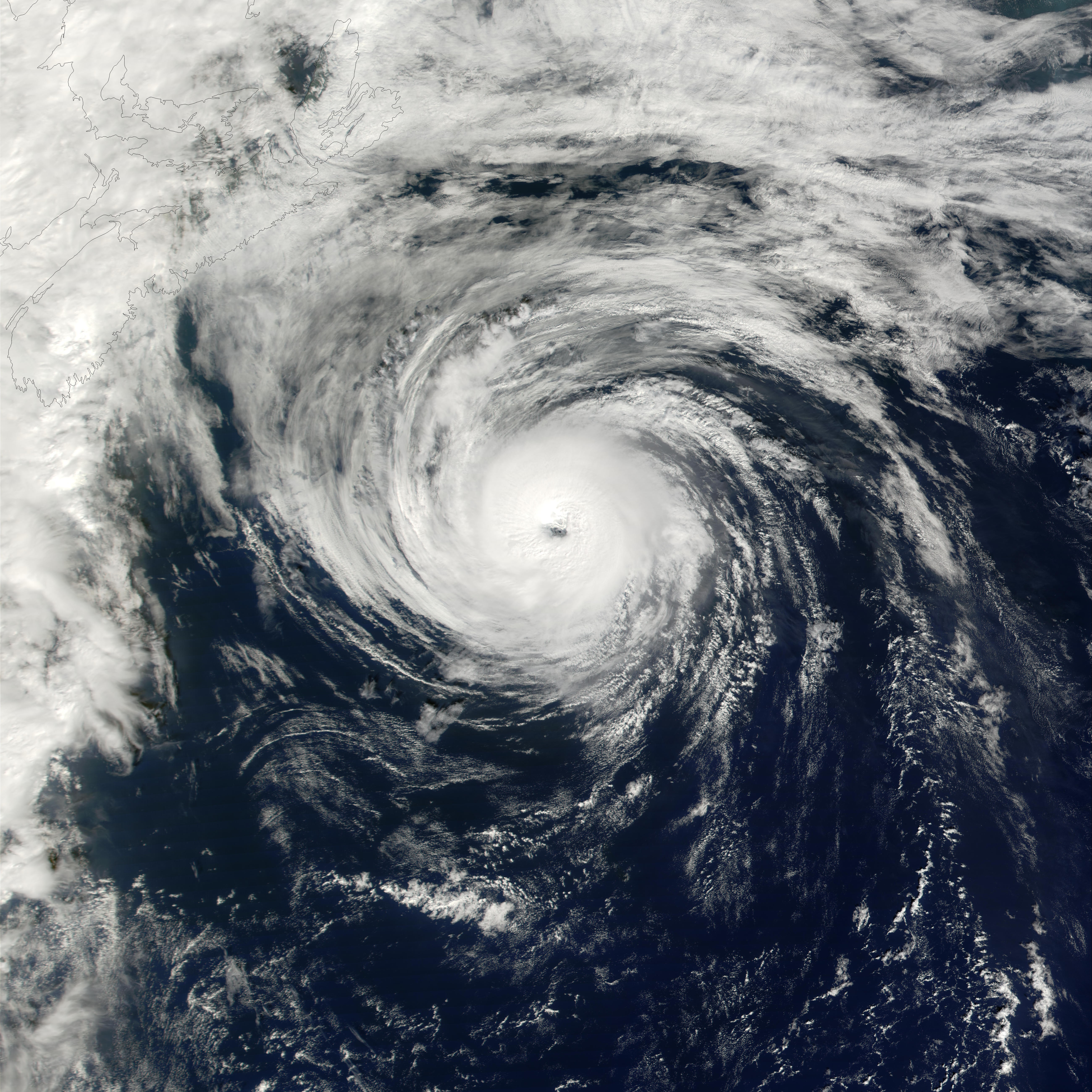
Hurricane Humberto as a Category 2 on September 26

September 26

- 12:00 UTC (8:00 a.m. AST) – Hurricane Humberto re-intensifies into a Category 2 hurricane and simultaneously attains its peak intensity with maximum sustained winds of 105 mph (165 km/h) and a minimum barometric pressure of 970 mbar (hPa; 28.64 inHg) roughly 490 mi (790 km) southwest of Cape Race, Newfoundland.
- 18:00 UTC (2:00 p.m. AST) – Hurricane Humberto weakens to a Category 1 hurricane for a second time approximately 385 mi (620 km) south-southwest of Cape Race, Newfoundland.

September 27

- 12:00 UTC (8:00 a.m. AST) – Hurricane Humberto weakens to a tropical storm about 415 mi (670 km) southeast of Cape Race, Newfoundland.

September 28

- 00:00 UTC (8:00 p.m. AST, September 27) – Tropical Storm Humberto dissipates over the far northern Atlantic.

=== October ===
October 4

- 12:00 UTC (8:00 a.m. AST) – Tropical Depression Eleven develops from an area of low pressure about 100 mi (160 km) southeast of Barbados.

October 5

- 12:00 UTC (8:00 a.m. AST) – Tropical Depression Eleven intensifies into Tropical Storm Iris roughly 275 mi (445 km) southeast of San Juan, Puerto Rico.

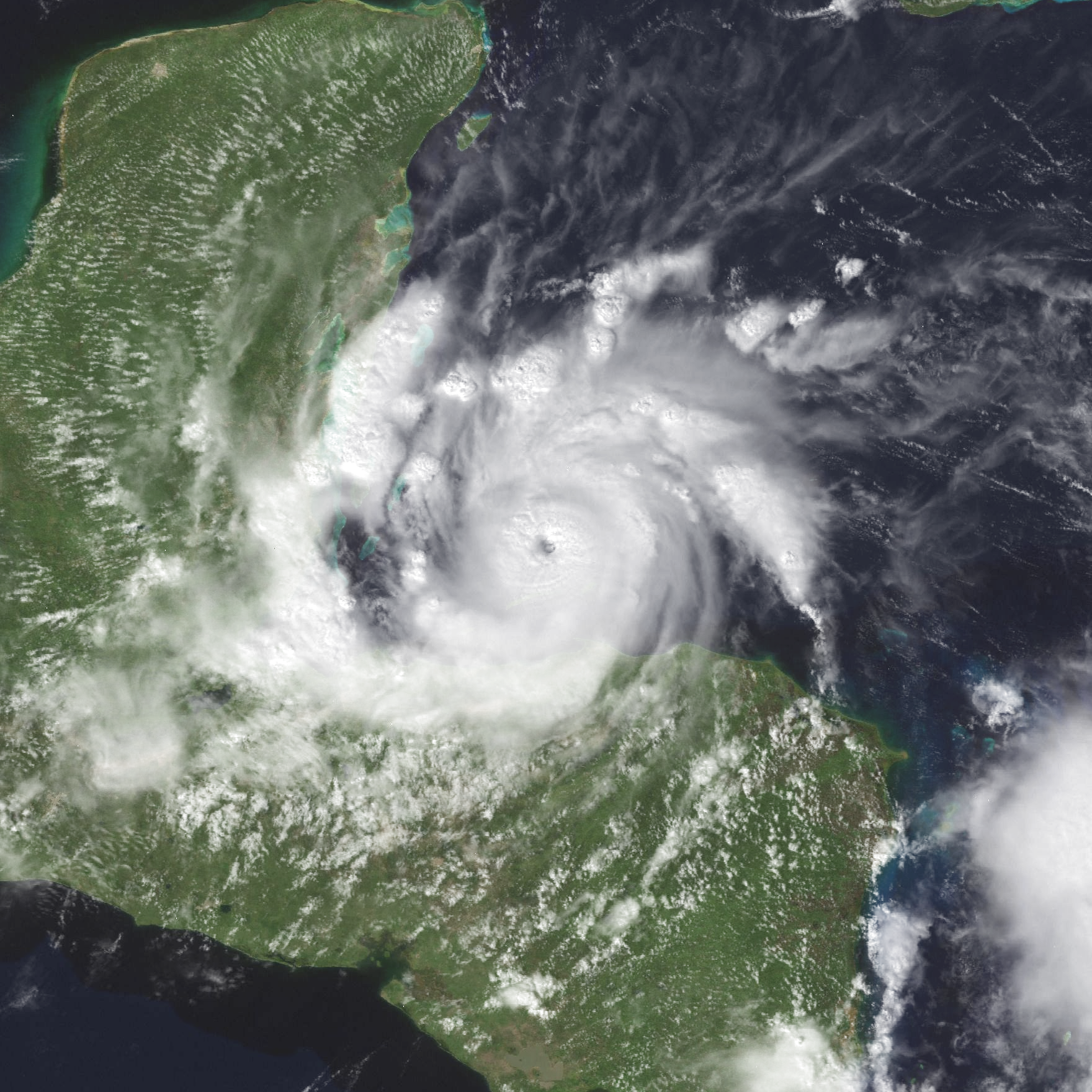
Iris near peak intensity on October 8

October 6

- 12:00 UTC (8:00 a.m. AST) – Tropical Depression Twelve develops from an area of low pressure about 620 mi (1,000 km) east-southeast of Barbados.
- 18:00 UTC (2:00 p.m. AST) – Tropical Storm Iris intensifies into a Category 1 hurricane approximately 65 mi (100 km) southwest of Beata Island, Dominican Republic.

October 7

- 00:00 UTC (8:00 p.m. AST, October 6) – Tropical Depression Twelve intensifies into Tropical Storm Jerry roughly 415 mi (670 km) southeast of Barbados.

October 8

- 06:00 UTC (2:00 a.m. EDT) – Hurricane Iris intensifies into a Category 2 hurricane about 155 mi (250 km) south-southwest of the Cayman Islands.
- 06:00 UTC (2:00 a.m. AST) – Tropical Storm Jerry attains its peak intensity with maximum sustained winds of 50 mph (85 km/h) and a minimum barometric pressure of 1004 mbar (hPa; 29.65 inHg) approximately 60 mi (95 km) west of Saint Lucia.
- 12:00 UTC (8:00 a.m. EDT) – Hurricane Iris intensifies into a Category 4 hurricane, skipping Category 3 intensity, roughly 230 mi (370 km) southwest of the Cayman Islands.
- 18:00 UTC (2:00 p.m. AST) – Tropical Storm Jerry weakens to a tropical depression about 235 mi (380 km) south of Saint Croix.

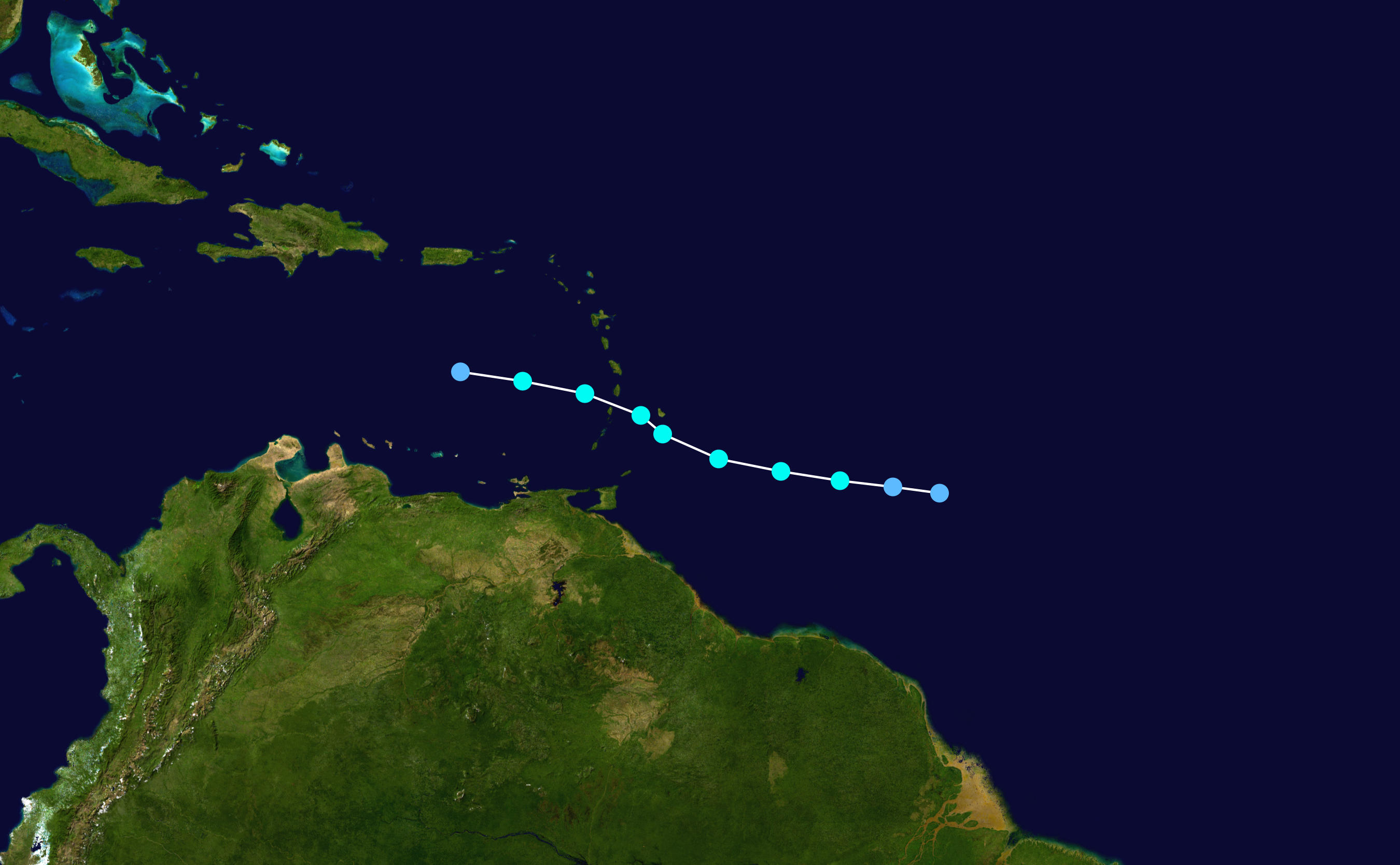
Storm path of Tropical Storm Jerry

October 9

- 00:00 UTC (8:00 p.m. EDT, October 8) – Hurricane Iris attains its peak intensity with maximum sustained winds of 145 mph (235 km/h) and a minimum barometric pressure of 948 mbar (hPa; 27.99 inHg) approximately 35 mi (55 km) northeast of Monkey River Town, Belize.
- 00:00 UTC (8:00 p.m. AST, October 8) – Tropical Depression Jerry dissipates south of Puerto Rico.
- 02:00 UTC (9:00 p.m. CDT, October 8) – Hurricane Iris makes landfall near Monkey River Town, Belize, with winds of 145 mph (235 km/h).
- 06:00 UTC (2:00 a.m. CDT) – Hurricane Iris weakens to a tropical storm about 30 mi (50 km) southeast of Sayaxché, Guatemala.
- 12:00 UTC (8:00 a.m. CDT) – Tropical Storm Iris weakens to a tropical depression roughly 15 mi (25 km) east of Comitán, Mexico.
- 18:00 UTC (2:00 p.m. CDT) – Tropical Depression Iris dissipates over the Sierra Madre de Chiapas.

Karen just prior to becoming a hurricane on October 13

October 12

- 00:00 UTC (8:00 p.m. AST, October 11) – Subtropical Storm One develops from an area of low pressure approximately 35 mi (55 km) south of Bermuda.

October 13

- 06:00 UTC (2:00 a.m. AST) – Subtropical Storm One transitions into Tropical Storm Karen about 195 mi (315 km) north of Bermuda.
- 18:00 UTC (2:00 p.m. AST) – Tropical Storm Karen intensifies into a Category 1 hurricane roughly 340 mi (545 km) north of Bermuda.

October 14

- 06:00 UTC (2:00 a.m. AST) – Hurricane Karen attains its peak intensity with maximum sustained winds of 80 mph (130 km/h) and a minimum barometric pressure of 998 mbar (hPa; 29.47 inHg) approximately 440 mi (710 km) north of Bermuda.
- 12:00 UTC (8:00 a.m. AST) – Hurricane Karen weakens to a tropical storm about 480 mi (775 km) north of Bermuda.

October 15

- 12:00 UTC (8:00 a.m. AST) – Tropical Storm Karen makes landfall near Western Head, Nova Scotia, with maximum sustained winds of 45 mph (75 km/h).
- 18:00 UTC (2:00 p.m. AST) – Tropical Storm Karen transitions into an extratropical cyclone roughly 105 mi (170 km) northwest of Cape Breton Island.

October 16

- 00:00 UTC (8:00 p.m. AST, October 15) – The extratropical remnants of Karen are absorbed by a larger extratropical low over the Gulf of Saint Lawrence.

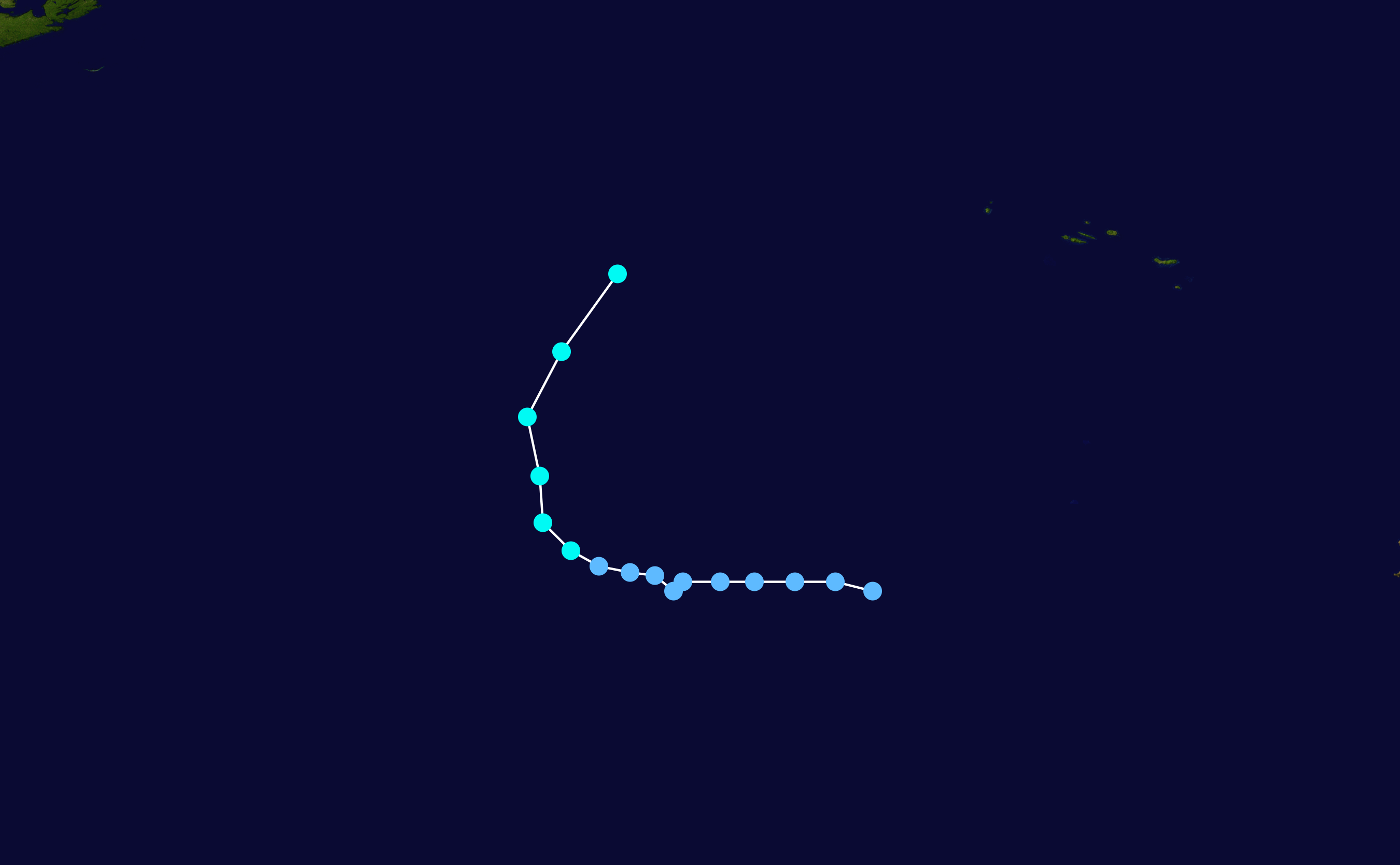
Storm path of Tropical Storm Lorenzo

October 27

- 12:00 UTC (8:00 a.m. AST) – Tropical Depression Fourteen develops from an area of low pressure approximately 815 mi (1,310 km) south-southwest of the westernmost Azores.

October 29

- 18:00 UTC (1:00 p.m. EST) – Tropical Depression Fifteen develops from an area of low pressure about 10 mi (20 km) south-southwest of Prinzapolka, Nicaragua.

October 30

- 00:00 UTC (7:00 p.m. AST, October 29) – Tropical Depression Fourteen intensifies into Tropical Storm Lorenzo and simultaneously attains its peak intensity with maximum sustained winds of 40 mph (65 km/h) and a minimum barometric pressure of 1007 mbar (hPa; 29.74 inHg) about 1,070 mi (1,720 km) southwest of the westernmost Azores.

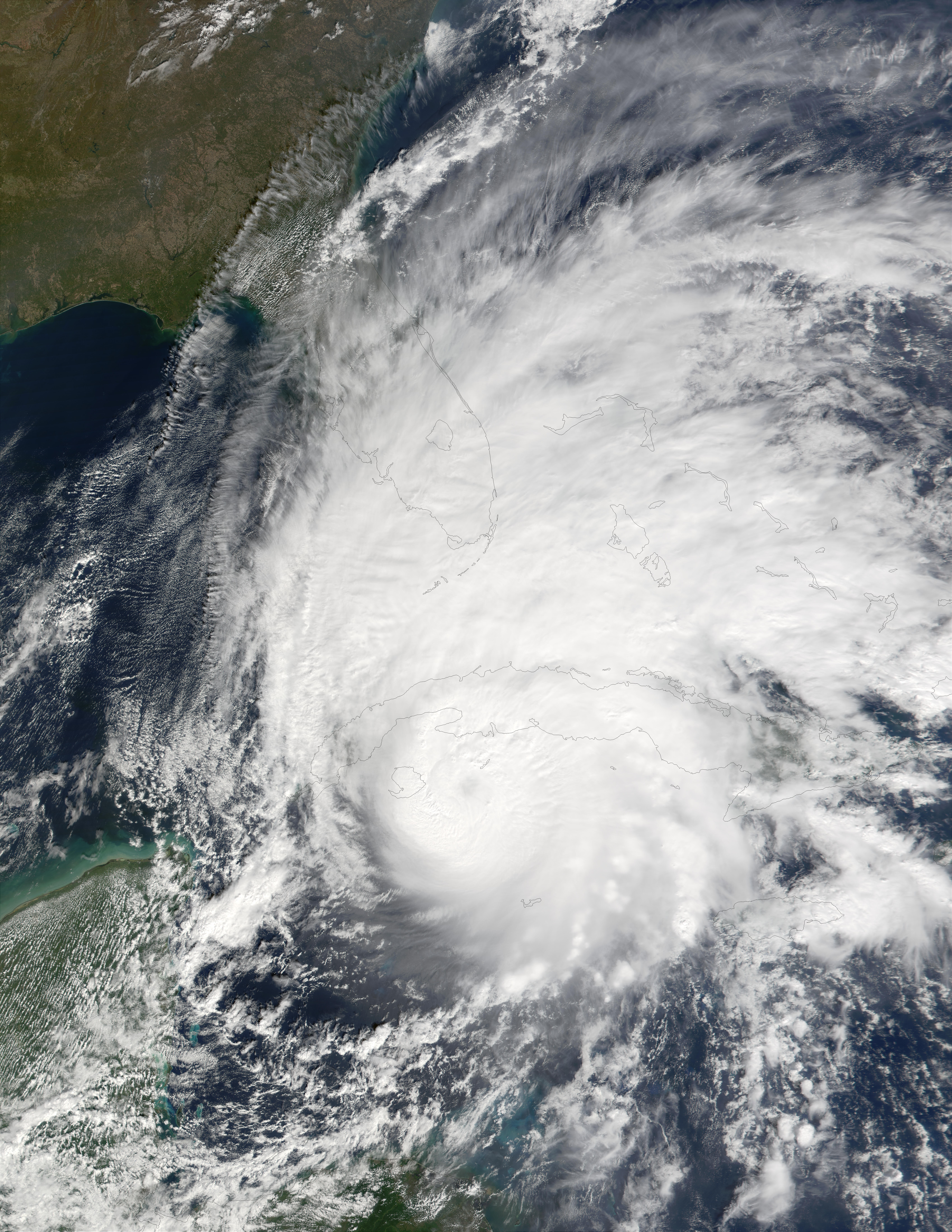
Hurricane Michelle approaching Cuba as a Category 4

October 31

- 12:00 UTC (7:00 a.m. AST) – Tropical Storm Lorenzo merges with a frontal zone roughly 690 mi (1,110 km) west of the westernmost Azores.

=== November ===
November 1

- 00:00 UTC (7:00 p.m. EST, October 31) – Tropical Depression Fifteen intensifies into Tropical Storm Michelle about 60 mi (95 km) north of Cabo Gracias a Dios, Nicaragua.

November 2

- 12:00 UTC (7:00 a.m. EST) – Tropical Storm Michelle intensifies into a Category 1 hurricane roughly 200 mi (320 km) southwest of Grand Cayman.

November 3

- 00:00 UTC (7:00 p.m. EST, November 2) – Hurricane Michelle intensifies into a Category 2 hurricane approximately 180 mi (290 km) west-southwest of Grand Cayman.
- 06:00 UTC (1:00 a.m. EST) – Hurricane Michelle intensifies into a Category 3 hurricane about 195 mi (315 km) west of Grand Cayman.
- 12:00 UTC (7:00 a.m. EST) – Hurricane Michelle intensifies into a Category 4 hurricane roughly 195 mi (315 km) west of Grand Cayman.
- 18:00 UTC (1:00 p.m. EST) – Hurricane Michelle weakens to a Category 3 hurricane but attains its minimum barometric pressure of 938 mbar (hPa; 27.70 inHg) approximately 180 mi (290 km) west of Grand Cayman.

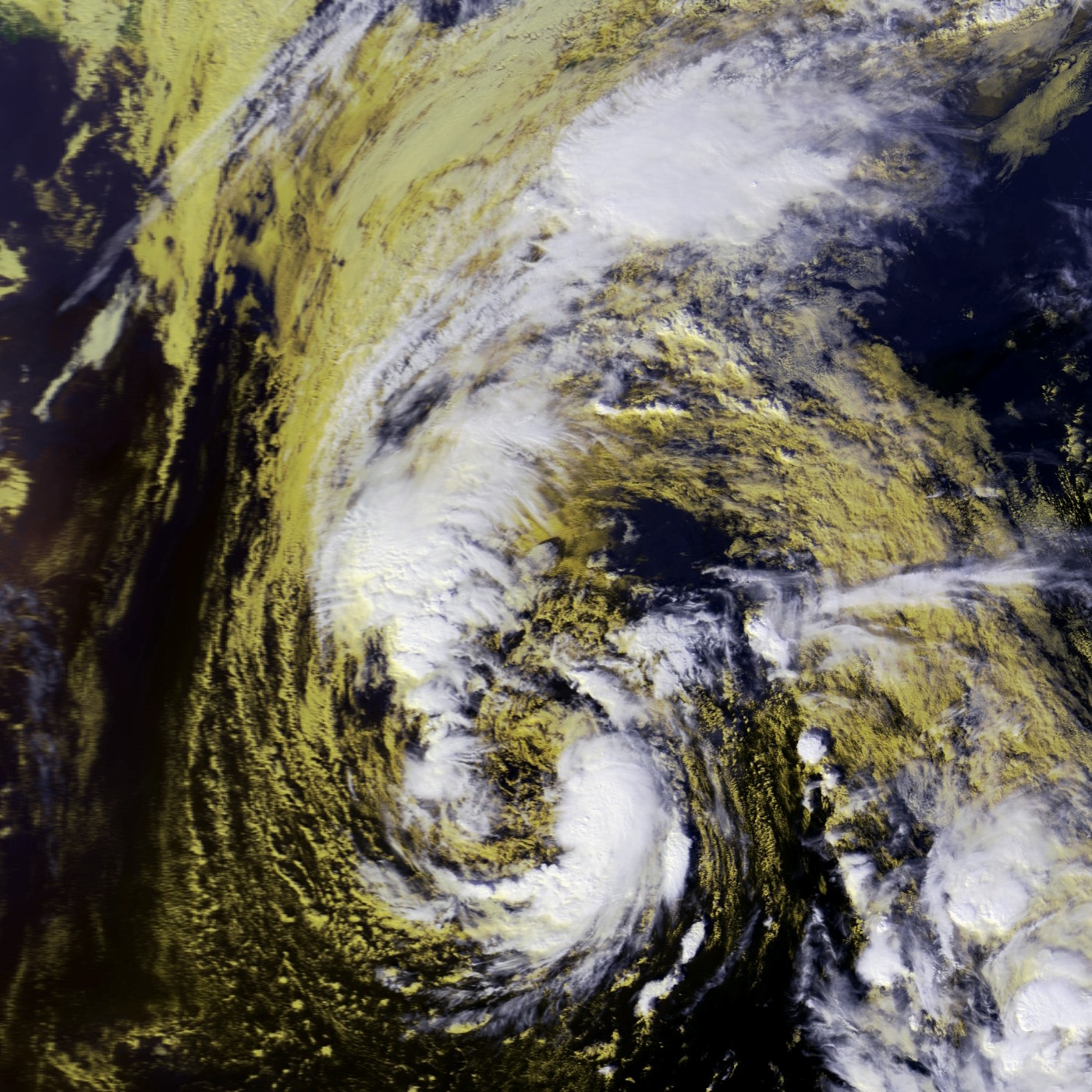
Noel after making the transition into a hurricane

November 4

- 00:00 UTC (7:00 p.m. EST, November 3) – Hurricane Michelle re-intensifies into a Category 4 hurricane about 155 mi (250 km) west-northwest of Grand Cayman.
- 00:00 UTC (7:00 p.m. EST, November 3) – A subtropical storm develops from an area of low pressure approximately 890 mi (1,430 km) south of Cape Race, Newfoundland.
- 06:00 UTC (1:00 a.m. EST) – Hurricane Michelle attains its peak winds of 140 mph (220 km/h) roughly 135 mi (215 km) northwest of Grand Cayman.
- 18:00 UTC (1:00 p.m. EST) – Hurricane Michelle makes its first landfall near Cayo Largo del Sur, Cuba, with winds of 140 mph (220 km/h).
- 23:00 UTC (6:00 p.m. EST) – Hurricane Michelle makes its second landfall near Bay of Pigs, Cuba, with winds of 130 mph (210 km/h).

November 5

- 00:00 UTC (7:00 p.m. EST, November 4) – Hurricane Michelle weakens to a Category 3 hurricane approximately 30 mi (50 km) south of Colón, Cuba.
- 06:00 UTC (1:00 a.m. EST) – Hurricane Michelle weakens to a Category 1 hurricane about 200 mi (320 km) southwest of Nassau, Bahamas.
- 12:00 UTC (7:00 a.m. EST) – Hurricane Michelle makes its third landfall on Andros, Bahamas, with winds of 90 mph (150 km/h).
- 12:00 UTC (7:00 a.m. AST) – The subtropical storm intensifies into Hurricane Noel and simultaneously attains its peak intensity with maximum sustained winds of 75 mph (120 km/h) and a minimum barometric pressure of 986 mbar (hPa; 29.12 inHg) roughly 615 mi (990 km) south-southeast of Cape Race, Newfoundland.
- 18:00 UTC (1:00 a.m. EST) – Hurricane Michelle makes its fourth and final landfall on Eleuthera, Bahamas, with winds of 85 mph (135 km/h).

November 6

- 00:00 UTC (7:00 p.m. EST, November 5) – Hurricane Michelle transitions into an extratropical cyclone about 200 mi (320 km) northeast of Nassau, Bahamas.
- 00:00 UTC (7:00 p.m. AST, November 5) – Hurricane Noel weakens to a tropical storm roughly 505 mi (815 km) south-southeast of Cape Race, Newfoundland.
- 12:00 UTC (7:00 a.m. AST) – Tropical Storm Noel transitions into an extratropical cyclone approximately 330 mi (530 km) southeast of Cape Race, Newfoundland.

November 7

- 00:00 UTC (7:00 p.m. EST, November 6) – The extratropical remnants of Michelle are absorbed by a frontal system well southwest of Bermuda.
- 00:00 UTC (7:00 p.m. EST, November 6) – The extratropical remnants of Noel are absorbed by an extratropical low well southeast of Newfoundland.

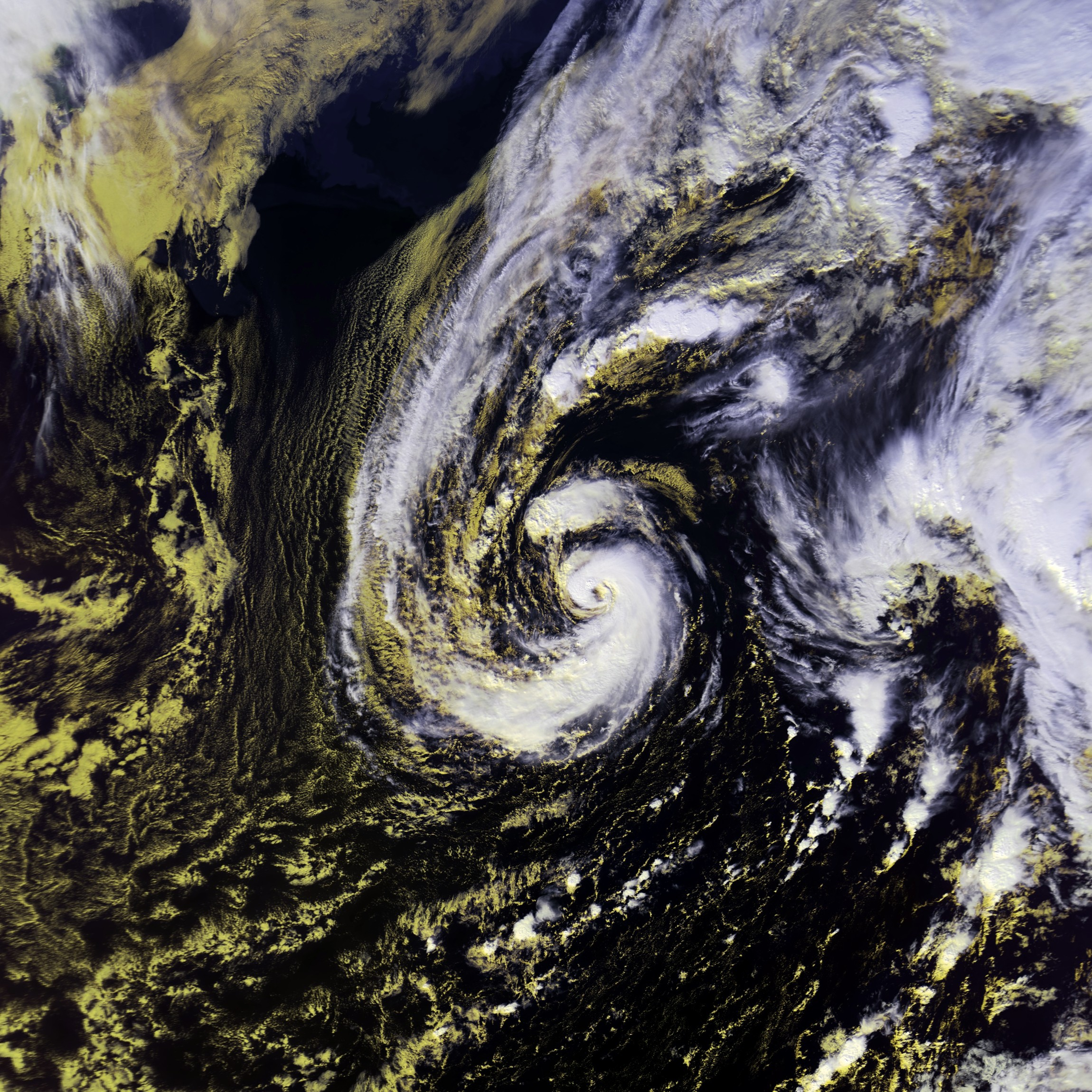
Hurricane Olga near peak intensity on November 27

November 24

- 00:00 UTC (7:00 p.m. AST, November 23) – Subtropical Storm Two develops from an area of low pressure about 900 mi (1,450 km) east-southeast of Bermuda.
- 12:00 UTC (7:00 a.m. AST) – Subtropical Storm Two transitions into Tropical Storm Olga roughly 910 mi (1,465 km) east-southeast of Bermuda.

November 26

- 12:00 UTC (7:00 a.m. AST) – Tropical Storm Olga intensifies into a Category 1 hurricane approximately 535 mi (860 km) east-southeast of Bermuda.

November 27

- 06:00 UTC (1:00 a.m. AST) – Hurricane Olga attains its peak intensity with maximum sustained winds of 90 mph (150 km/h) and a minimum barometric pressure of 973 mbar (hPa; 28.74 inHg) about 455 mi (730 km) east of Bermuda.

November 29

- 06:00 UTC (1:00 a.m. AST) – Hurricane Olga weakens to a tropical storm roughly 415 mi (670 km) southeast of Bermuda.

November 30

- The 2001 Atlantic hurricane season officially ends.
- 12:00 UTC (7:00 a.m. AST) – Tropical Storm Olga weakens to a tropical depression approximately 545 mi (875 km) south-southwest of Bermuda.

=== December ===
December 2

- 00:00 UTC (7:00 p.m. AST, December 1) – Tropical Depression Olga re-intensifies into a tropical storm about 660 mi (1,060 km) south-southwest of Bermuda.

December 4

- 00:00 UTC (7:00 p.m. AST, December 3) – Tropical Storm Olga weakens to a tropical depression for a second time roughly 405 mi (650 km) southwest of Bermuda.

December 5

- 00:00 UTC (7:00 p.m. AST, December 4) – Tropical Depression Olga dissipates approximately 690 mi (1,110 km) east of Nassau, Bahamas.

== See also ==
- Lists of Atlantic hurricanes
