= Hurricane Franklin (2017) =

Category 1 Atlantic hurricane

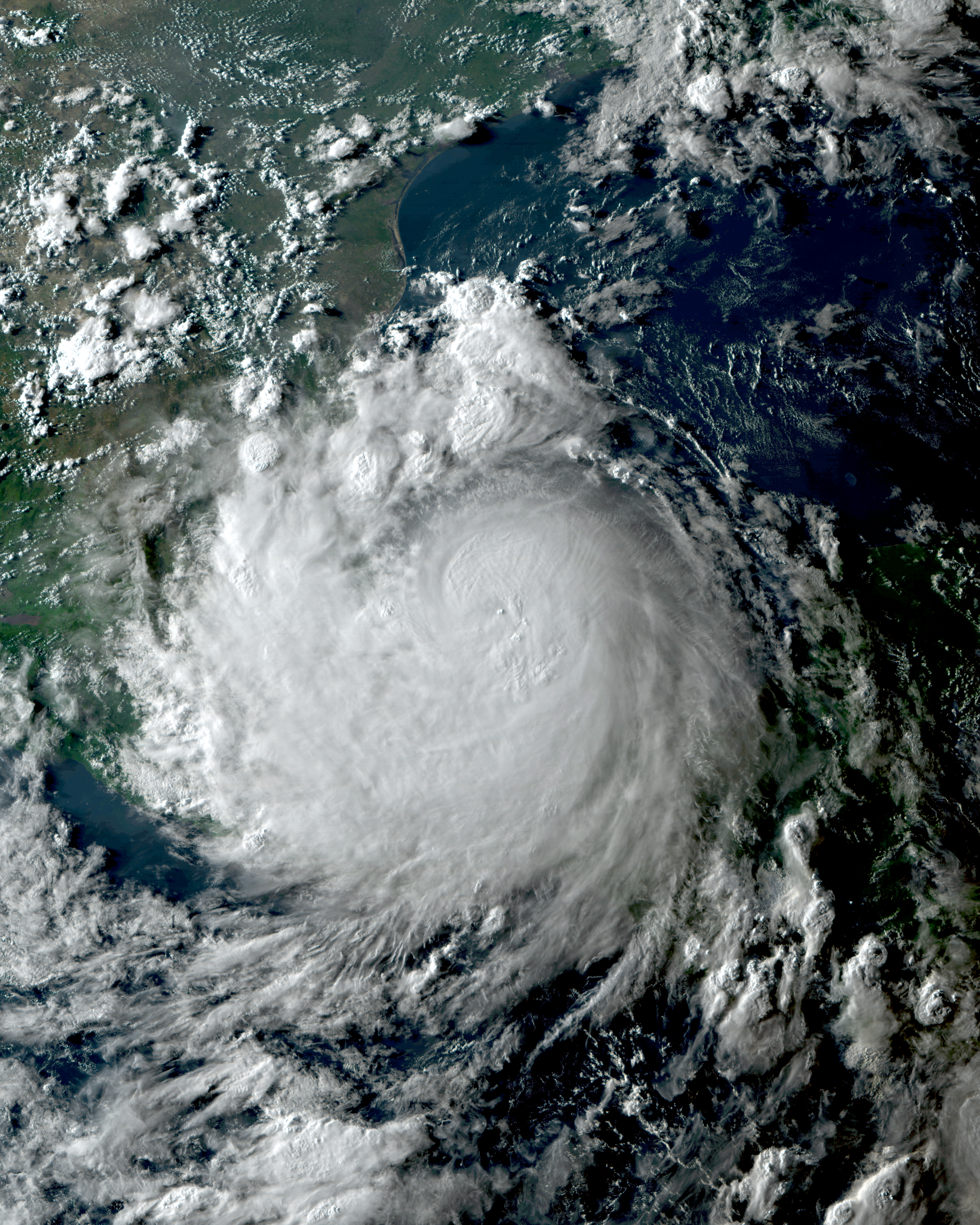
- Franklin near peak intensity, shortly before landfall, late on August 9

Meteorological history
- Formed: August 7, 2017
- Dissipated: August 10, 2017

Category 1 hurricane
- 1-minute sustained (SSHWS/NWS)
- Highest winds: 85 mph (140 km/h)
- Lowest pressure: 981 mbar (hPa); 28.97 inHg

Overall effects
- Fatalities: None
- Damage: $15 million (2017 USD)
- Areas affected: Belize, Cayman Islands, Yucatán Peninsula, Veracruz, Western Mexico, Texas
- IBTrACS
- Part of the 2017 Atlantic hurricane season

Hurricane Franklin was the first tropical cyclone to make landfall in the Mexican state of Veracruz since Hurricane Karl in 2010. The sixth named storm, first hurricane and the first of ten consecutive hurricanes of the 2017 Atlantic hurricane season, Franklin formed on August 7 out of a tropical wave that was first tracked in the southeastern Caribbean Sea on August 3. The storm strengthened within a favorable environment and made landfall on the Yucatán Peninsula as a moderate tropical storm early on August 8 north of Belize. Weakening occurred as it crossed the peninsula, but Franklin re-emerged into the Bay of Campeche later that day, restrengthening quickly to become the season's first hurricane. It made landfall near Lechuguillas, Veracruz, on August 10 as a Category 1 hurricane, before rapidly weakening over the mountainous terrain of Mexico and dissipating shortly afterwards. On August 12, the storm's remnant mid-level circulation combined with a developing low in the Eastern Pacific to form Tropical Storm Jova.

Franklin's main impacts were located in Eastern Mexico, specifically in the state of Veracruz where Franklin made landfall as a hurricane. Strong winds downed trees and power lines, in addition to damaging homes and crops. Heavy rains flooded some rivers and caused a few landslides. Damages in that area totaled US$15 million. Other areas that Franklin affected, primarily by bringing heavy rain, included the Yucatán Peninsula and Belize. No deaths were reported to have occurred due to Franklin.

== Meteorological history ==
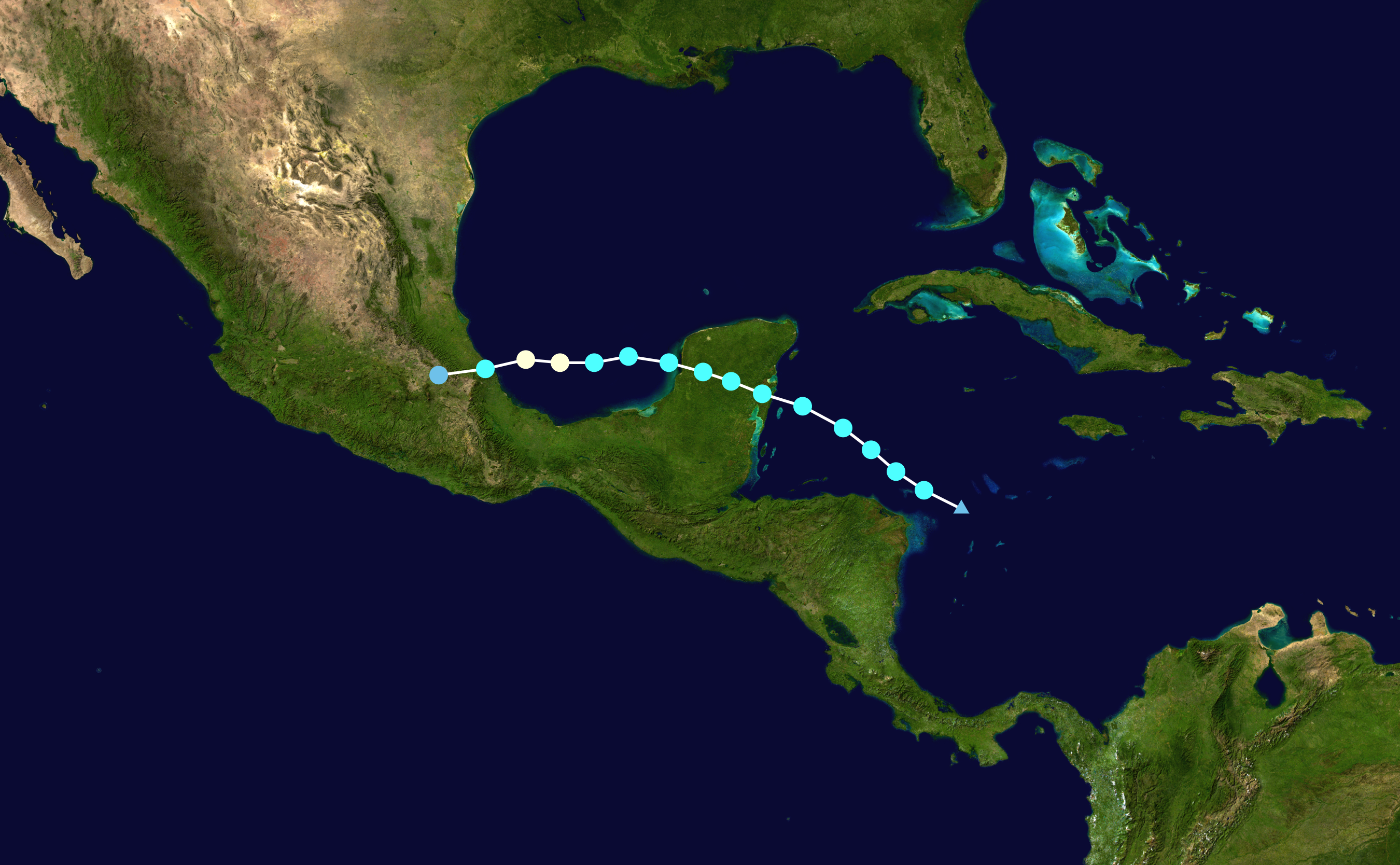
Map plotting the storm's track and intensity, according to the Saffir–Simpson scale Map key Saffir–Simpson scale Tropical depression (≤38 mph, ≤62 km/h) Tropical storm (39–73 mph, 63–118 km/h) Category 1 (74–95 mph, 119–153 km/h) Category 2 (96–110 mph, 154–177 km/h) Category 3 (111–129 mph, 178–208 km/h) Category 4 (130–156 mph, 209–251 km/h) Category 5 (≥157 mph, ≥252 km/h) Unknown Storm type Tropical cyclone Subtropical cyclone Extratropical cyclone, remnant low, tropical disturbance, or monsoon depression

On August 3, the National Hurricane Center (NHC) began monitoring a tropical wave that was located in the southeastern Caribbean Sea for possible tropical cyclogenesis. Relatively little change in organization occurred over the next two to three days as it moved westward at 10–15 mph (16–24 km/h), although global models continued to indicate that it could develop further once it entered to the Bay of Campeche. Early on August 5, convection associated with the tropical wave increased, signaling organization. Continued improvement of the wave led to development of a broad area of low pressure on August 6 roughly 150 miles (240 km) east of Honduras, which led to the designation of Potential Tropical Cyclone Seven at 21:00 UTC that day. A buoy over the western Caribbean near the disturbance reported sustained gale-force winds, and combined analysis with satellite images indicated that the circulation had become better defined, prompting the NHC to upgrade the disturbance to Tropical Storm Franklin at 00:00 UTC on August 7.

Located in a relatively favorable environment, with the only inhibiting factor being proximity to land, Franklin strengthened to an initial peak intensity of 60 mph (97 km/h) on August 7 before moving ashore near Pulticub, Quintana Roo, at 03:00 UTC on August 8. The cyclone weakened considerably while over the peninsula, however the satellite presentation remained well-defined, and the inner core tightened up considerably. Later that day, Franklin emerged into the Bay of Campeche and immediately began strengthening again, becoming a hurricane at 21:00 UTC on August 9. It achieved its peak intensity at 00:00 UTC on August 10 with winds of 85 mph (137 km/h) and a pressure of 981 mbar (29.0 inHg), before making landfall in Vega de Alatorre with winds of 80 mph (130 km/h) about five hours later. The cyclone rapidly weakened over the mountainous terrain of Mexico and dissipated shortly afterwards. The mid-level circulation of Franklin, however, remained intact as it traversed the mountainous terrain, and the remnants eventually regenerated into Tropical Storm Jova in the Eastern Pacific, early on August 12.

== Preparations and impact ==
=== Mexico ===
==== Yucatán Peninsula ====
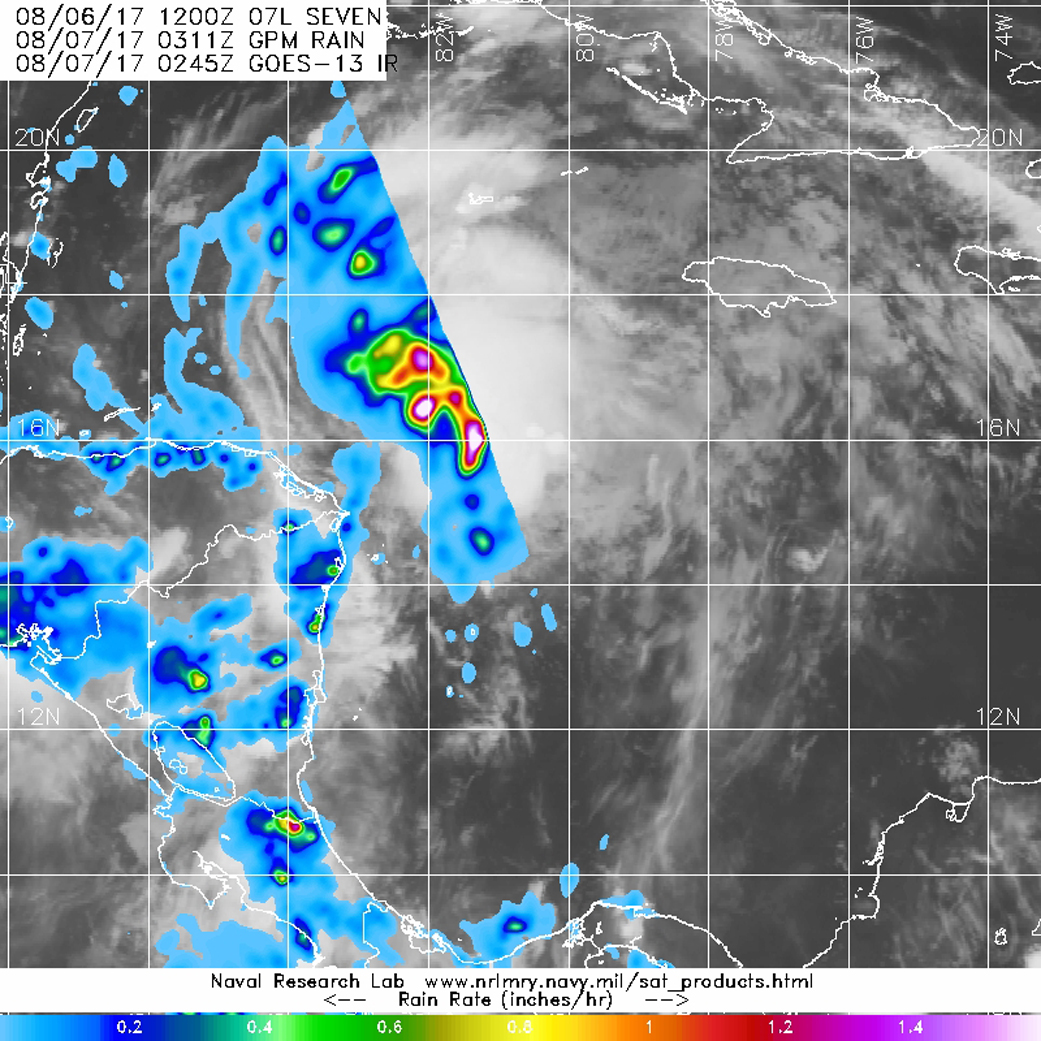
GPM rainfall data of Franklin as it approached the Yucatán Peninsula on August 7. Rain bands with rainfall rates greater than 41 mm (1.6 in) per hour were found near the storm center.

Immediately upon classification of Franklin as a potential tropical cyclone, tropical storm warnings were issued for much of the eastern side of the Yucatán Peninsula on August 6; a small portion of the coastline was issued a hurricane watch with the possibility of Franklin nearing hurricane intensity as it approached the coastline the next night. Approximately 330 people were reported to have gone into storm shelters, and around 2,200 relocated from the islands near the coastline to farther inland in advance of the storm. In Belize, damage was reported to be minimal as the storm tracked slightly more northwards than expected, lessening impacts. However, some areas still received up to a foot of rain.

==== Eastern Mexico ====
As Franklin approached the state of Veracruz, schools were shut down. Throughout the state, many trees were downed, isolated power outages were reported, and homes were damaged. Banana plantations, an invaluable source of income for local residents, were also impacted and some reported total losses. Some rivers were flooded, roads were cut off, and a few landslides were reported. A total of 1,562 people evacuated their homes in Huauchinango, located in the state of Puebla. Shelters were prepared while sailors and soldiers performed evacuations throughout mountainous regions as a precautionary measure. Damages throughout the region totaled US$15 million.

=== United States ===
Although rains from the outer bands of Franklin did not impact the United States, swells and rip currents were experienced across part of the coast of South Texas. The National Weather Service in Brownsville, Texas, issued a high surf advisory through the night of August 10.

== See also ==
- Weather of 2017
- Tropical cyclones in 2017
- List of Category 1 Atlantic hurricanes
- Hurricane Diana (1990) – Similarly timed storm that took a similar path.
- Tropical Storm Chantal (2001) – strong tropical storm that struck the Yucatán Peninsula.
- Hurricane Stan – similar path and intensity
- Tropical Storm Harvey (2011) – strong tropical storm that struck south of Belize.
- Hurricane Earl (2016) – similar early-season storm that struck Mexico the previous year.
