= Hurricane Gabrielle (2001) =

Category 1 Atlantic hurricane in 2001

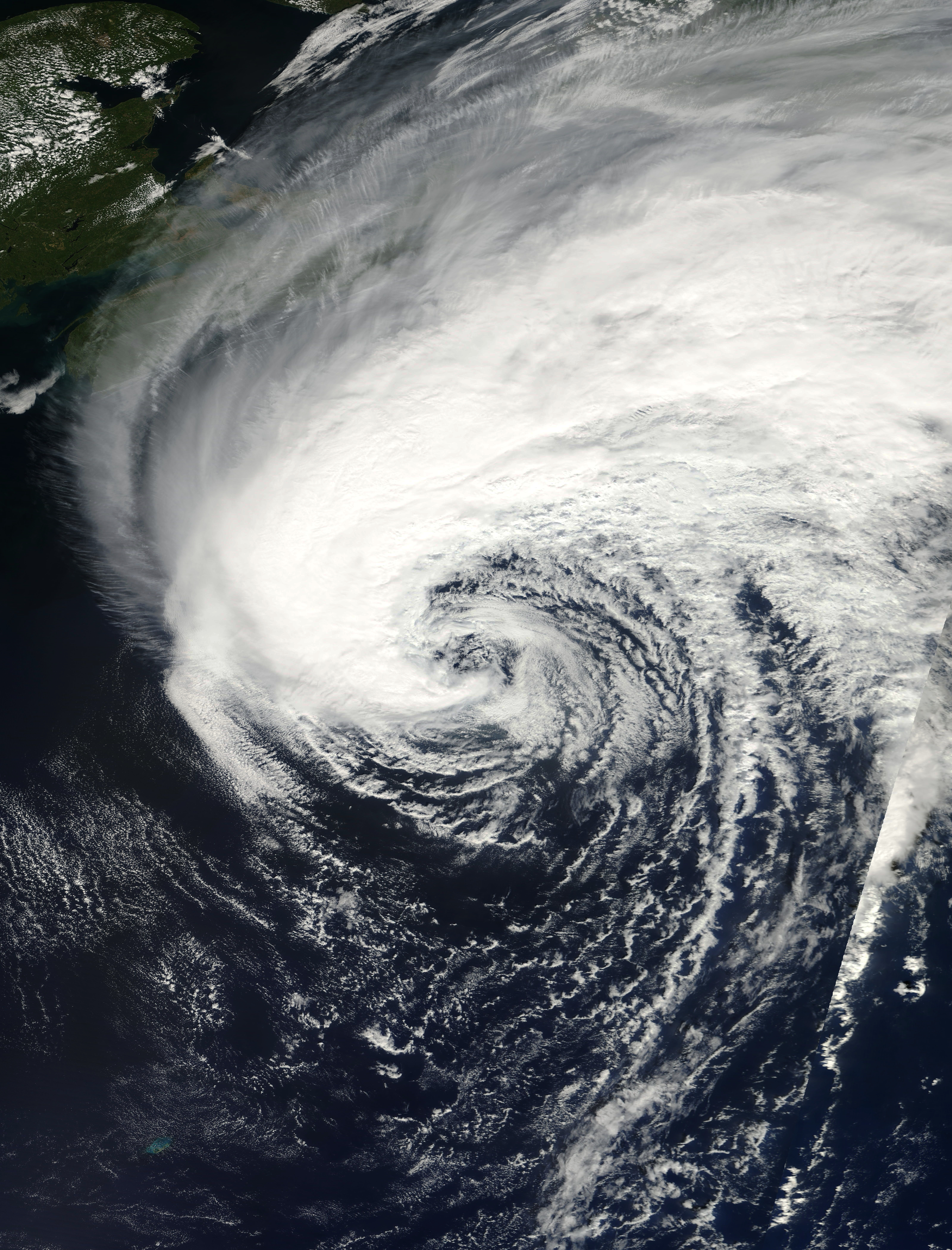
- Gabrielle at peak intensity on September 18

Meteorological history
- Formed: September 11, 2001
- Extratropical: September 19, 2001
- Dissipated: September 21, 2001

Category 1 hurricane
- 1-minute sustained (SSHWS/NWS)
- Highest winds: 80 mph (130 km/h)
- Lowest pressure: 975 mbar (hPa); 28.79 inHg

Overall effects
- Fatalities: 3
- Damage: >$230 million (2001 USD)
- Areas affected: Florida, Newfoundland
- IBTrACS
- Part of the 2001 Atlantic hurricane season

Hurricane Gabrielle was a North Atlantic hurricane that caused flooding in both Florida and Newfoundland in September 2001. It developed in the Gulf of Mexico on the same day as the September 11 attacks; after the attacks, flights were canceled nationwide for two days, and when Gabrielle struck Florida on September 14, it caused a day of additional cancellations. The storm moved ashore with winds of 70 mph (110 km/h) near Venice, a city located south of the Tampa Bay area. The combination of the winds and heavy rainfall, which peaked at 15.1 in (380 mm) in Parrish, left 570,000 customers without power along the west coast and 126,000 customers without power on the east coast. The storm caused about $230 million in damage in Florida. In the Gulf of Mexico, high waves contributed to two deaths, one of which was indirect; there was also a death due to flooding in Winter Haven.

After crossing the state, Gabrielle had the appearance of an occluded frontal low or subtropical cyclone; this was after the convection decreased near the center. However, Gabrielle gradually re-intensified and became a hurricane on September 17 as it passed northwest of Bermuda. The hurricane reached peak winds of 80 mph (130 km/h), but weakened subsequently due to wind shear. Gabrielle transitioned into an extratropical cyclone on September 19, and later that day it passed just southeast of Newfoundland. The storm produced record rainfall that caused what was described the "worst flooding in 100 years" in St. John's. Several roads and houses were flooded in the region. The extratropical remnants of Gabrielle continued to the northeast and dissipated on September 21.

== Meteorological history ==
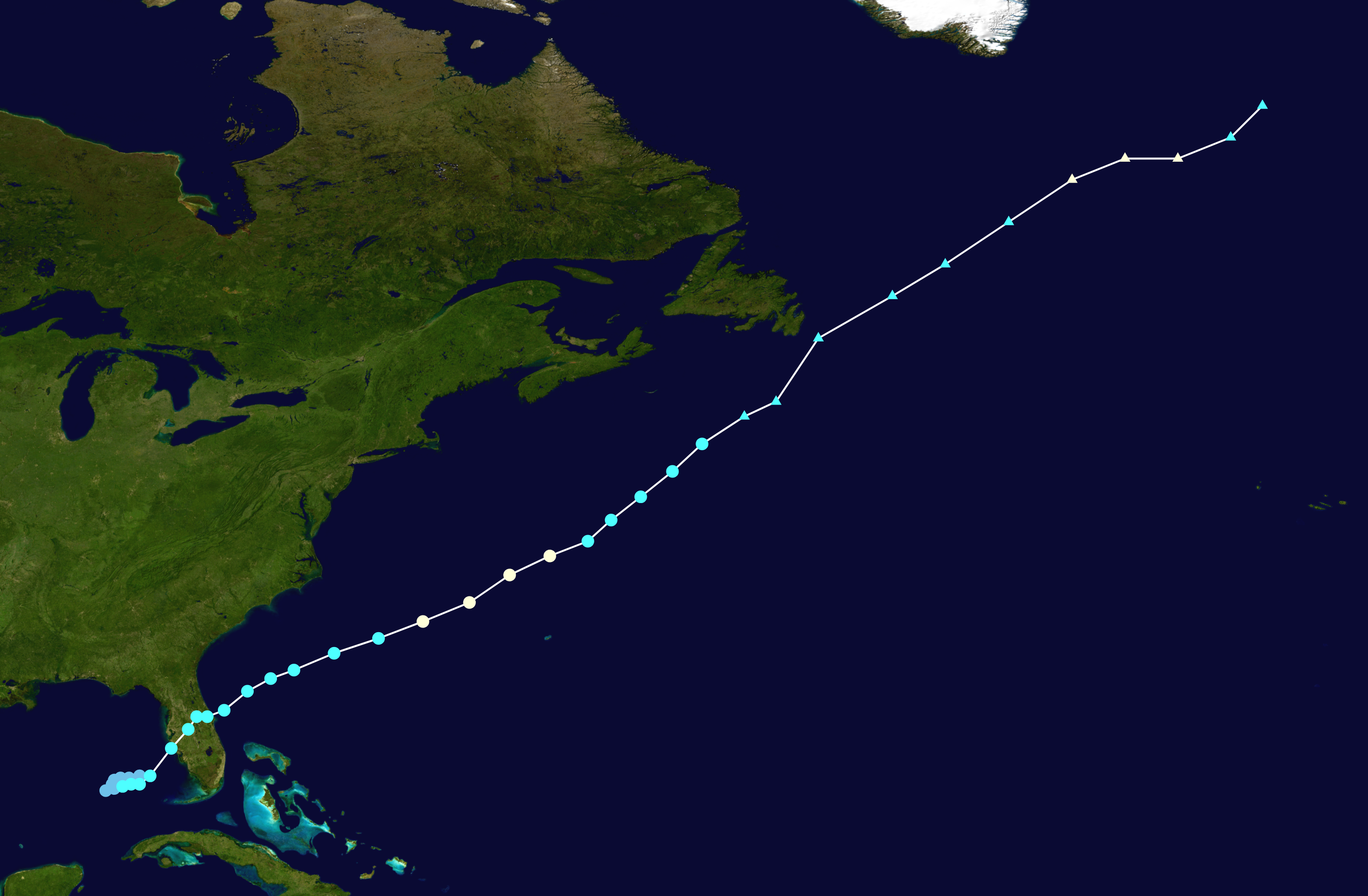
Map plotting the storm's track and intensity, according to the Saffir–Simpson scale Map key Saffir–Simpson scale Tropical depression (≤38 mph, ≤62 km/h) Tropical storm (39–73 mph, 63–118 km/h) Category 1 (74–95 mph, 119–153 km/h) Category 2 (96–110 mph, 154–177 km/h) Category 3 (111–129 mph, 178–208 km/h) Category 4 (130–156 mph, 209–251 km/h) Category 5 (≥157 mph, ≥252 km/h) Unknown Storm type Tropical cyclone Subtropical cyclone Extratropical cyclone, remnant low, tropical disturbance, or monsoon depression

On September 5, a weak low- to mid-level trough was nearly stationary a short distance off the southeastern coastline of the United States. It remained stationary for several days, before developing a low-level circulation over Florida by September 9. The system moved into the Gulf of Mexico, and by September 11, the low and its associated convection were well-organized enough for the National Hurricane Center (NHC) to classify it as Tropical Depression Eight. By that time, the system was located about 170 mi (270 km) west-northwest of Key West, Florida. Located in an environment of weak steering currents, the depression drifted to the west-southwest after forming. Northerly wind shear and the presence of a nearby upper-level low initially prevented further organization, leaving the center of the depression poorly–defined with minimal convection. The depression gradually became better organized while it slowly executed a small counter-clockwise loop. Early on September 12, the system developed increased banding features over the eastern half of its circulation. By early on September 13, the upper level outflow over the depression became much more conducive for intensification, although the circulation remained broad and weak. Shortly thereafter, deep convection developed and persisted near the center, and at 1200 UTC on September 13, the depression intensified into Tropical Storm Gabrielle while located about 200 miles (320 km) southwest of Venice, Florida.

Under the influence of a mid-level trough, Gabrielle accelerated northeastward and quickly intensified, despite increasing amounts of westerly wind shear. Its center reformed several times under the deep convection, and on September 14 Gabrielle made landfall near Venice with winds of 70 mph (110 km/h). At the time, Hurricane Hunters reported gusts to hurricane force, and the National Hurricane Center indicated the possibility that Gabrielle made landfall as a hurricane. Land interaction and vertical wind shear quickly weakened Gabrielle over land; its convection decreased markedly with the strongest remaining convection remaining well to the northeast of the center. The storm reached the Atlantic Ocean with winds of 45 mph (72 km/h) about 18 hours after it made landfall; by that time, one forecaster at the National Hurricane Center remarked that the storm resembled an occluded frontal low, with a large circulation devoid of convection in a non-symmetric wind field. Another forecaster likened the storm to a subtropical cyclone, due to dry air continuing to limit organization.

Tropical Storm Gabrielle over Florida on September 14

On September 15, convection gradually developed closer to the center, though operationally forecasters were unsure whether the convection was in association with Gabrielle or to a cold front to its west. A Hurricane Hunters flight into the system reported the center of Gabrielle became elongated, resembling a trough, and one forecaster considered the storm on the verge of becoming an extratropical cyclone. Shortly thereafter, convection increased near the center as the storm became stronger and better organized. Despite strong amounts of wind shear, Gabrielle intensified to attain hurricane status early on September 17 while located about 350 mi (560 km) to the west of Bermuda. Continuing northeastward, the hurricane strengthened slightly further to reach peak winds of 80 mph (130 km/h) about 230 miles (370 km) northwest of Bermuda. Shortly thereafter, a banding eye briefly developed in the center of the convection. Increased wind shear eventually diminished the convection, and Gabrielle weakened to tropical storm status September 18. By early on September 19, wind shear dissipated nearly all of the associated deep convection, and Gabrielle transitioned into an extratropical cyclone about 350 miles (560 km) south of Newfoundland. The extratropical remnant continued to the northeast, passing a short distance southeast of Newfoundland before restrengthening to reach winds of 75 mph (121 km/h). The storm weakened, and on September 21 the extratropical remnant of Gabrielle merged with another extratropical storm over the far northern Atlantic Ocean.

== Preparations ==
Shortly after Gabrielle became a tropical storm, the National Hurricane Center issued a tropical storm warning from Craig Key through the Dry Tortugas in the Florida Keys and along the Florida west coast from Flamingo to the mouth of the Suwannee River. Additionally, a hurricane watch was issued from Chokoloskee to Tarpon Springs. On September 14, a tropical storm warning was issued for Lake Okeechobee and the Florida east coast from Jupiter to Saint Augustine. Due to the storm, schools in six counties along the west coast were closed. All aircraft from MacDill Air Force Base were evacuated to Kansas as a precaution. Gabrielle struck Florida three days after the September 11 attacks, after which all flights nationwide were canceled for two days. Flights resumed the day Gabrielle moved ashore, with the exception of Sarasota-Bradenton International Airport which closed due to the inclement weather. In the Tampa area, two major bridges closed due to the storm. Disney World closed three water parks and several rides.

The government of Bermuda issued a gale warning for the island before changing it to a tropical storm warning on September 16.

The Newfoundland Weather Center issued severe weather warnings for portions of Atlantic Canada prior to the arrival of the extratropical remnant of Gabrielle. Rough sea warnings were issued for waters off of the Avalon Peninsula of eastern Newfoundland, and fishermen were recommended to remain away from the sea.

== Impact ==
=== United States ===
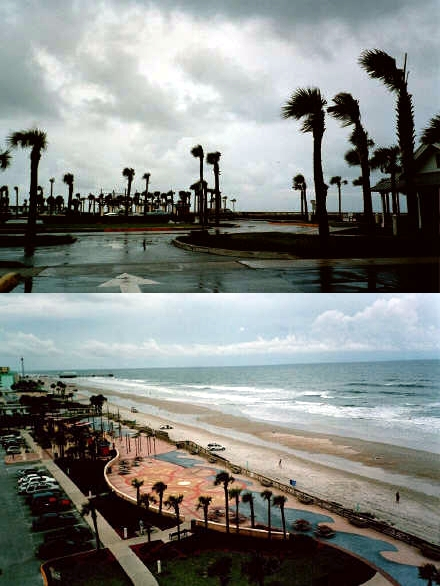
Daytona Beach during Gabrielle

While the storm was moving east across the Gulf of Mexico, Gabrielle produced rip currents along the coast of Alabama, killing one man in Orange Beach. High surf along the Florida Panhandle destroyed a retaining wall in Pensacola Beach. In the Florida Keys, there was an indirect drowning death of a man who fell off his boat; this was due to a combination of high seas, engine failure, and intoxication. Upon making landfall, Gabrielle produced moderate winds along coastal areas of western Florida, with sustained winds of 58 mph (93 km/h) at Venice. The same station reported a wind gust of 73 mph (117 km/h). High tides from rough waves and the storm surge reached 6.2 feet (1.9 m), the highest tide since 1926. The tide flooded the northern shoreline of Charlotte Harbor and at the entrance to the Peace River, while further to the south a surge of greater than 3 feet (0.91 m) inundated the barrier island at Fort Myers Beach and flooded some cars. Beach erosion was common in the areas where the storm surge was greatest.

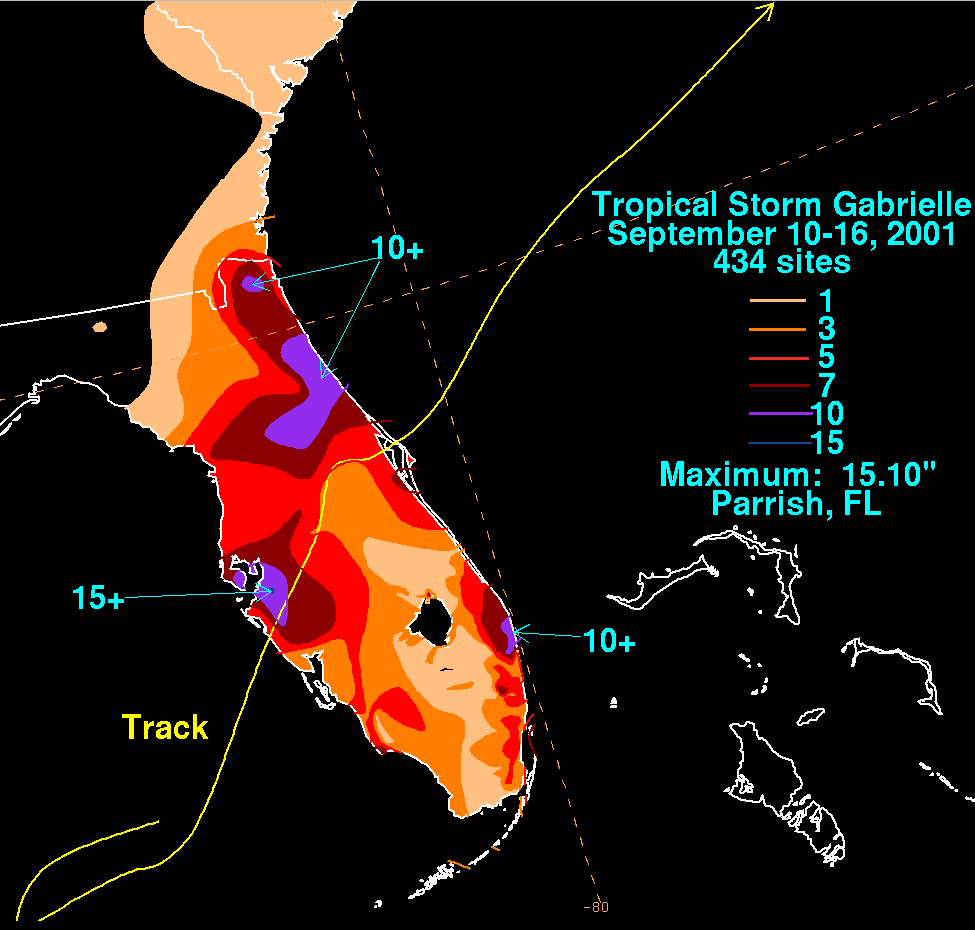
Total rainfall from Gabrielle in the United States

In Lee County, tropical storm-force winds damaged many roofs, although damage was primarily due to flooding. Along the coast, high storm tides severely damaged about 100 homes and lightly damaged 500 other homes. In nearby Charlotte County, several homes were flooded along Gasparilla Island. Strong winds in Sarasota and Manatee counties downed trees and power lines, and across western Florida, 570,000 electric customers lost power. In Bradenton, high winds damaged the roof of a motel, forcing 100 people to evacuate. High rainfall in Pasco County flooded a portion of U.S. Route 301. Along the west coast of Florida, Gabrielle spawned four weak tornadoes. In Everglades City, sustained winds reached 51 mph (82 km/h), with gusts to 70 mph (110 km/h).

While crossing the state, Gabrielle interacted with a decaying cold front, which produced intense rainfall. The highest total was 15.1 in (380 mm) in Parrish along the west coast. Gabrielle and its precursor dropped heavy precipitation over some parts of southeast Florida, especially in Palm Beach County, where the Palm Beach International Airport observed 9.58 in (243 mm) of rain on September 12 and September 13 combined. Floodwaters inundated some streets in the county and entered several homes near Palm Beach Gardens. However, water management officials considered the rains more beneficial than destructive, as the storm ended a 22-month rainfall deficit across southeast Florida. Jacksonville reported 6.32 in (161 mm) in a 24‑hour period. In Winter Springs, a boy drowned after being swept away by a flooded stream. In Volusia, the rains flooded about 30 homes or apartments, and roads in several counties were closed. After moving across the state, the storm produced locally strong winds along the Atlantic Florida coastline, peaking at 59 mph (95 km/h) at Saint Augustine. High wind gusts left about 126,000 homes and businesses without power in eastern Florida. Rainbands spawned five tornadoes, one of which damaged six mobile homes in Cocoa. Along the coast in Brevard and Volusia, high storm tides and waves produced significant beach erosion.

Overall, Gabrielle caused an estimated $230 million in damage in Florida. There were 18 tornadoes in the state, and three deaths related to the storm. Heavy rainfall extended into Georgia; a station in Brunswick reported a total of 3.84 in (98 mm). In South Carolina, high winds and tides produced coastal flooding in Garden City.

=== Bermuda and Canada ===
In Bermuda, the combination of Gabrielle and the cold front to its west dropped about 1.8 in (46 mm) of precipitation in a four-day period. Wind gusts peaked at 55 mph (89 km/h) in an outer rainband.

While extratropical, the remnants of Gabrielle passed a short distance south of Newfoundland, the second cyclone in less than a week to affect the area. The storm produced moderately strong wind gusts of over 60 mph (100 km) across the southern portion of the island, including a peak gust of 80 mph (130 km/h) at Cape Race. Seas reached 36 ft (11 m) in height. The remnant of Gabrielle dropped heavy rainfall in a short amount of time across Newfoundland, with one station at Cape Race recording 1.9 in (48 mm) in just one hour. This set the all time 6–hour precipitation record at St. John's, with a total of 3.54 in (90 mm). In a 24‑hour period, the St. John's airport recorded 4.67 in (118.6 mm), which was only 0.1 in (2.6 mm) less than the existing record. Rainfall peaked at 6.9 in (175 mm) at the Memorial University of Newfoundland in St. John's.

In St. John's, the rainfall caused severe flooding, and the mayor of the city considered Gabrielle "the worst storm in 100 years". The flooding washed out two roads and flooded 20 others, forcing several closures. The rains flooded the basements of houses with several feet of water, affecting at least four homes. Flooding damage closed 15 schools and affected 45 businesses. There were multiple reports of sewers unable to accompany the excess of water. Hurricane-force wind gusts forced the cancellation of flights and left thousands without power, telephone, or heat. Dangerous conditions caused Canada Post to cancel delivery on the day of the storm. Hundreds of homes and buildings were damaged by the passage of Gabrielle, resulting in several million Canadian dollars in damage.

== Aftermath ==
Despite the flooding in Florida, the heavy rainfall proved beneficial in alleviating drought conditions. By late September, water levels in 18 counties in southwestern Florida were within the normal range for the first time in 18 months. On September 28, the head of the Federal Emergency Management Agency declared seven Florida counties as disaster areas; this allocated federal funding for debris removal and repairing damaged public facilities. After the storm's passage, there were more than 32,000 insurance claims for homes, and 10,000 claims for damaged cars.

In response to the flooding in St. John's, Newfoundland, the city mayor activated the city's Emergency Preparedness Program. On September 27, about a week after the passage of the storm, the Emergency Measures Organization began accepting applications for flood-related damage. By about a month after the storm, 169 applications were processed, with an additional 1,762 received by the Emergency Measures Organization. Eligibility for the disaster assistance included restoration to property or household items of an essential nature. A few days after the passage of the storm, the government of Newfoundland appealed to the federal government for federal disaster relief fund; the government later approved. Ultimately, disaster relief assistance totaled $6.3 million (2001 CAD), primarily to individual assistance.

== See also ==
- Other storms of the same name
- List of Atlantic hurricanes
- List of Florida hurricanes (2000–present)
- Timeline of the 2001 Atlantic hurricane season
- Hurricane Sandy (2012) - Similar hurricane structure that struck Florida, New York etc.
- Tropical Storm Alex (2022) - A storm that had a near-exact track and intensity. Had a similar structure as well.
