= 2001 Atlantic hurricane season =

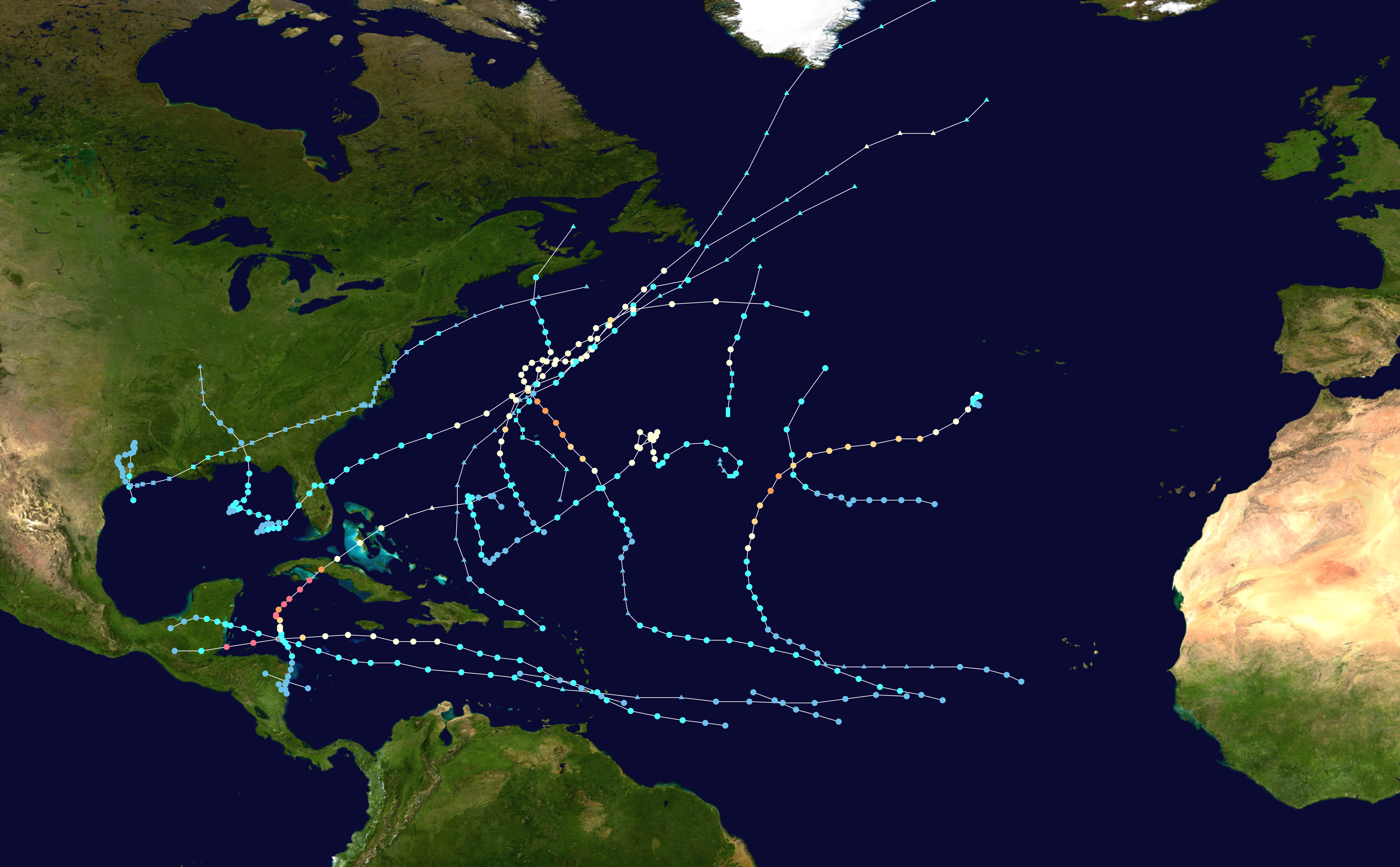
- Season summary map

Seasonal boundaries
- First system formed: June 5, 2001
- Last system dissipated: December 4, 2001

Strongest storm
- By maximum sustained winds: Iris
  - Maximum winds: 145 mph (230 km/h) (1-minute sustained)
  - Lowest pressure: 948 mbar (hPa; 27.99 inHg)
- By central pressure: Michelle
  - Maximum winds: 140 mph (220 km/h) (1-minute sustained)
  - Lowest pressure: 933 mbar (hPa; 27.55 inHg)

Seasonal statistics
- Total depressions: 17
- Total storms: 15
- Hurricanes: 9
- Major hurricanes (Cat. 3+): 4
- ACE: 110
- Total fatalities: 148 total
- Total damage: $11.453 billion (2001 USD)

Related articles
- Timeline of the 2001 Atlantic hurricane season; 2001 Pacific hurricane season; 2001 Pacific typhoon season; 2001 North Indian Ocean cyclone season

The 2001 Atlantic hurricane season was a fairly active Atlantic hurricane season that produced 17 tropical cyclones, 15 named storms, nine hurricanes, and four major hurricanes. The season officially lasted from June 1 to November 30, dates which by convention limit the period of each year when tropical cyclones tend to form in the Atlantic Ocean basin. The season began with Tropical Storm Allison on June 5, and ended with Hurricane Olga, which dissipated on December 6.

The most damaging storms of the season were Allison, which caused extensive flooding in Texas; Hurricane Iris, which struck Belize; and Hurricane Michelle, which left a trail of destruction across Cuba. Three tropical cyclones made landfall in the United States, three directly affected Canada, and three directly affected Mexico and Central America. Overall, the season caused 148 fatalities, and $11.45 billion (2001 USD) in damage. Due to their severe damage, the names Allison, Iris, and Michelle were retired by the World Meteorological Organization.

Similar to the previous season, of the three cyclones (Allison, Barry, and Gabrielle) that made landfall in the United States, none achieved higher than tropical storm status.

== Seasonal forecasts ==
Predictions of tropical activity in the 2001 season
Source	Date	Named storms	Hurricanes	Major hurricanes
CSU	Average (1950–2000)	9.6	5.9	2.3
NOAA	Average (1950–2005)	11.0	6.2	2.7
Record high activity		30	15	7
Record low activity		1	0	0
CSU	December 7, 2000	9	5	2
CSU	April 5, 2001	12	7	3
NOAA	May 21, 2001	8–11	5–7	2–3
CSU	August 7, 2001	12	7	3
NOAA	August 8, 2001	9–12	6–8	2–4
Actual activity		15	9	4

Forecasts of hurricane activity are issued before each hurricane season by noted hurricane experts William M. Gray. Philip J. Klotzbach, and their associates at Colorado State University; and separately by NOAA forecasters.

Gray's team defined the average number of storms per season (1950 to 2000) as 9.6 tropical storms, 5.9 hurricanes, 2.3 major hurricanes (storms reaching at least Category 3 strength in the Saffir-Simpson Hurricane Scale) and ACE Index 96.1. The National Oceanic and Atmospheric Administration (NOAA) defines a season as above-normal, near-normal or below-normal by a combination of the number of named storms, the number reaching hurricane strength, the number reaching major hurricane strength and ACE Index.

=== Pre-season forecasts ===
On December 7, 2000, Gray's team issued its first extended-range forecast for the 2001 season, predicting above-average activity (13 named storms, 8 hurricanes, and about 4 of Category 3 or higher). It listed a 63 percent chance of at least one major hurricane striking the U.S. mainland. This included a 43 percent chance of at least one major hurricane strike on the East Coast, including the Florida peninsula, and a 36 percent chance of at least one such strike on the Gulf Coast from the Florida Panhandle westward. The potential for major hurricane activity in the Caribbean was forecast to near average.

On April 5, 2001, a new forecast was issued, calling for 12 named storms, 7 hurricanes, and 3 major hurricanes. The increase in the forecast was attributed to the warm sea surface temperatures, although the agency noted that the season would likely not be as active as previous ones due to the effect of a weak to moderate El Nino. The estimated potential for at least one major hurricane to affect the U.S. was upped slightly to 65 percent; the East Coast potential also went up slightly, and from the Florida Panhandle westward to Brownsville, Texas, the probability remained nearly the same.

=== Mid-season forecasts ===
On August 7, 2001, Gray's team issued their first mid-season forecast for the 2001 season, keeping the forecast number at 12 named storms, with 7 becoming hurricanes and 3 becoming a major hurricane, noting that sea surface temperatures and sea level pressures continued to be favorable for above-average hurricane activity. The estimated potential for at least one major hurricane to affect the U.S. was upped slightly once again to 69 percent; the East Coast potential also went up slightly to 50%, and from the Florida Panhandle westward to Brownsville, Texas, the probability was also upped slightly.

On August 8, 2001, NOAA revised its season estimate slightly upwards to nine to twelve named storms, of which 6 to 8 were to be hurricanes, and 2 to 4 major hurricanes. The agency noted that sea surface temperatures continued to be favorable for above-average hurricane activity, and due to the likelihood that El Nino would not develop during the peak of the season, there was a reduced likelihood of a below-average year.

== Seasonal summary ==
Hurricane Erin near New York City after the September 11 attacks. The smoke plume from the destroyed Twin Towers can be seen in the upper left corner.

The Atlantic hurricane season officially began on June 1, 2001. It was an above-average season in which 17 tropical cyclones formed. Fifteen depressions attained tropical storm status, and nine of these reached hurricane status. Four hurricanes further intensified into major hurricanes. Favorable sea surface temperatures and sea-level pressures were the main factors in the season being above-average. The season was the fourth, and final, above-average season in a row. This streak set a record that stood until six consecutive seasons featured above-average activity from 2016 to 2021. Four tropical cyclones during the season would degenerate in the deep tropics but later re-develop. Four other systems were classified as subtropical cyclones at some point in their duration, though each later became fully tropical systems. Overall, the Atlantic tropical cyclones of 2001 collectively resulted in 148 deaths and around $11.45 billion in damage. The season ended on November 30, 2001.

Tropical cyclogenesis began in June, with Tropical Storm Allison forming just offshore Texas on June 5. After Allison transitioned into an extratropical cyclone on June 17, no further activity occurred until Tropical Depression Two developed on July 11. However, the depression dissipated the following day. Another break in activity ensued, which ended on August 2, when Tropical Storm Barry formed in the Gulf of Mexico. August featured two other tropical storms, Chantal and Dean.

Five systems formed in September, of which four become a hurricane, while one remained a tropical depression. October featured an equal number of systems, of which all five attained at least tropical storm intensity. One, Hurricane Iris, attained the highest sustained winds of any storm in 2001, at 145 mph (230 km/h), and devastated southern Belize on October 9. Another, Hurricane Michelle, attained the lowest barometric pressure of any storm that year, at 933 mbar (27.55 inHg), and cut a path of destruction across Cuba on November 4. Two additional systems developed in November, Hurricane Noel and Hurricane Olga. Olga dissipated on December 4, ending seasonal activity.

The season's activity was reflected with an accumulated cyclone energy (ACE) rating of 110, above the 1950–2000 average of 96.1. ACE is, broadly speaking, a measure of the power of the hurricane multiplied by the length of time it existed, so storms that last a long time, as well as particularly strong hurricanes, have high ACEs. It is only calculated for full advisories on tropical systems at or exceeding 39 mph (63 km/h), which is the threshold for tropical storm status.

== Systems ==
=== Tropical Storm Allison ===
- Tropical storm (SSHWS)
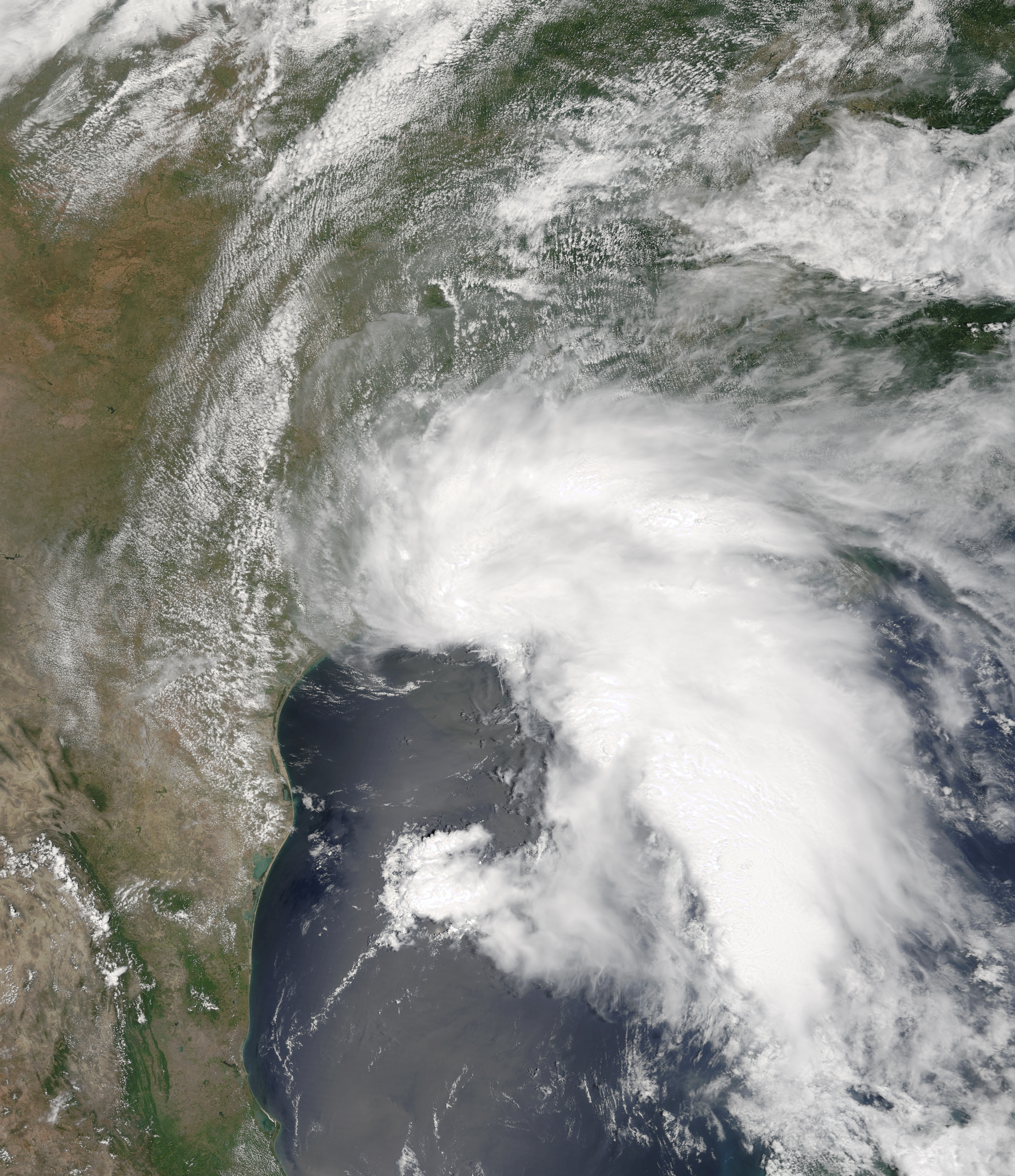
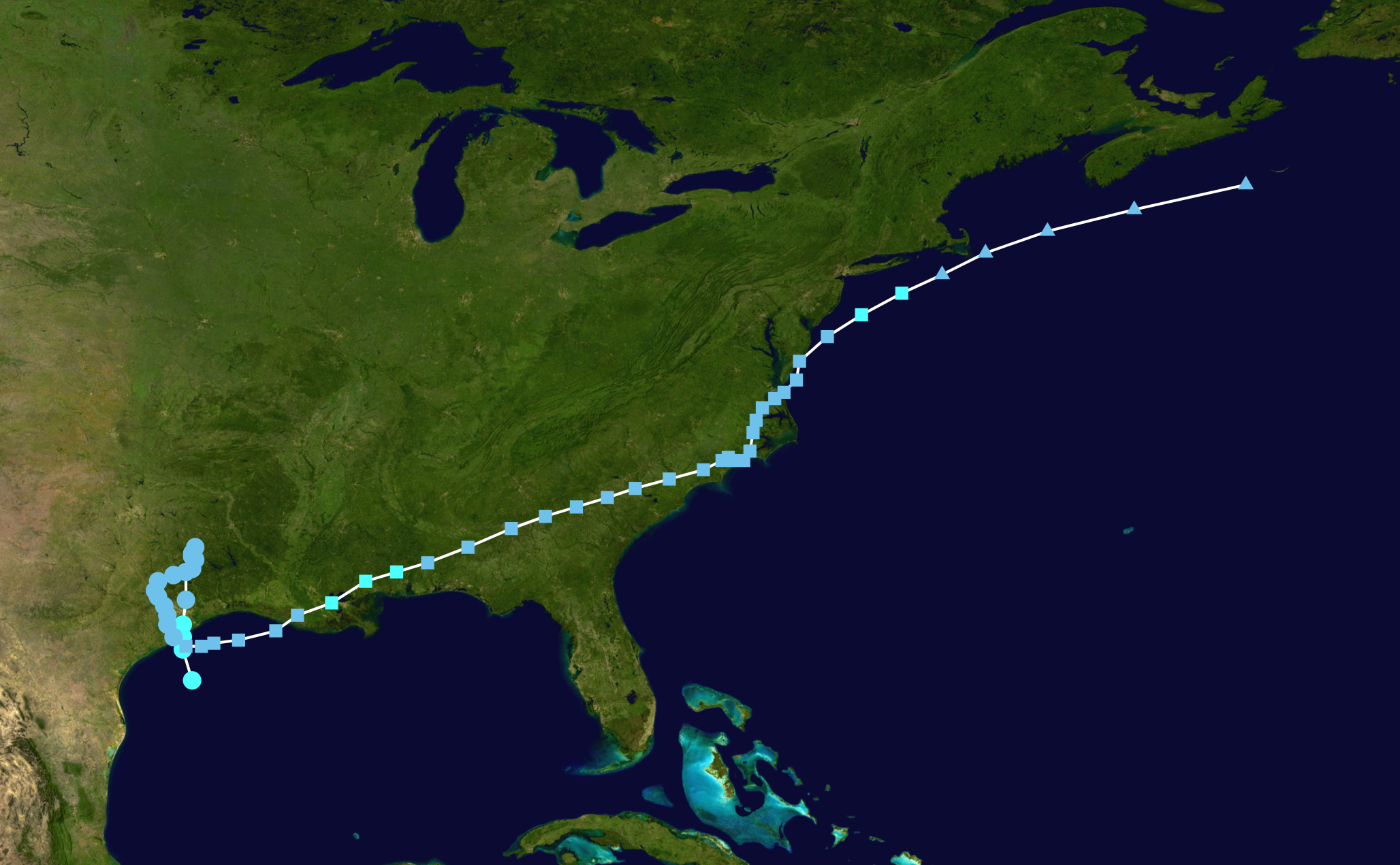
- Duration: June 5 – June 17
- Peak intensity: 60 mph (95 km/h) (1-min); 1000 mbar (hPa)

A tropical wave over the northwestern Gulf of Mexico developed into Tropical Storm Allison at 12:00 UTC on June 5 about 140 mi (225 km) south of Galveston, Texas. The cyclone strengthened and peaked six hours later with winds of 60 mph (95 km/h) and a minimum atmospheric pressure of 1,000 mbar (30 inHg). At 21:00 UTC on June 5, Allison made landfall near Freeport, Texas. It drifted northward through the state, turned to the south, and re-entered the Gulf of Mexico as a tropical depression on June 10. Allison then transitioned into a subtropical depression. The storm continued towards the east-northeast, made landfall on Louisiana early on June 11, and briefly became a subtropical storm despite being inland. Crossing the southeast United States and Mid-Atlantic, Allison emerged into the Atlantic at the Delmarva Peninsula on June 17. After temporarily re-attaining subtropical storm status, Allison interacted with a cold front offshore New England and became extratropical. Early on June 19, the remnant extratropical low dissipated near Nova Scotia.

Allison was the first storm since Tropical Storm Frances in 1998 to affect the northern Texas coastline. A major flood disaster occurred throughout its path and nearby areas from Texas to New England. The Greater Houston area of Texas suffered the brunt of the impact, as over 35 in (890 mm) of rain fell there when Allison stalled over the southeastern part of the state. In this area, flooding related to Allison destroyed or severely damaged more than 14,000 homes, while at least 51,430 others experienced some degree of damage. Floodwaters also entered over 95,000 vehicles and 1,700 businesses. The storm killed 50 people, including 27 who drowned. Overall, Allison caused about $8.5 billion in damage (2001 USD), making it the costliest and second-deadliest tropical storm on record in the United States.

=== Tropical Depression Two ===
- Tropical depression (SSHWS)
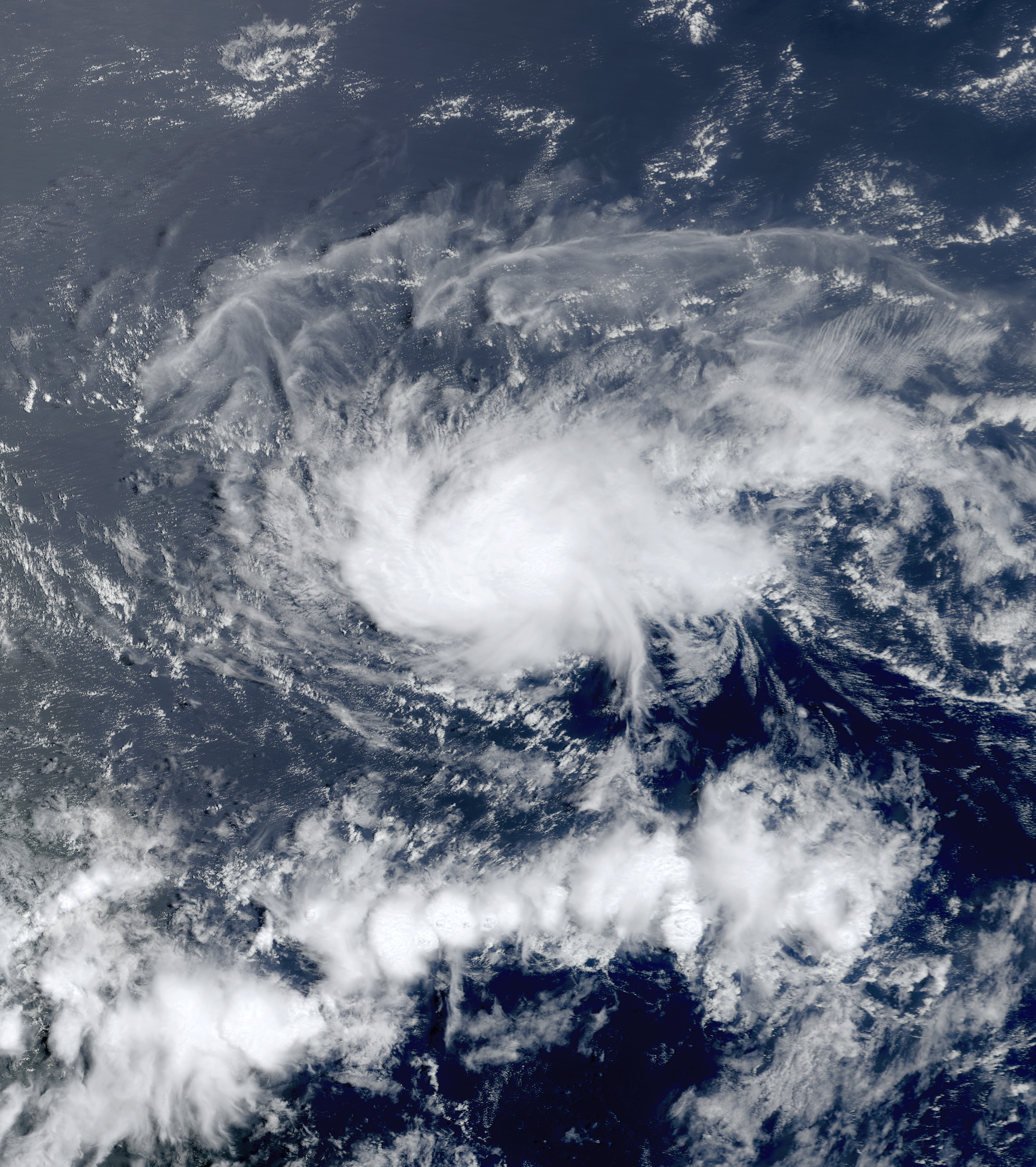
- Duration: July 11 – July 12
- Peak intensity: 30 mph (45 km/h) (1-min); 1010 mbar (hPa)

A tropical wave emerged into the Atlantic from the west coast of Africa on July 7. Moving westward, the system displayed signs of a weak low-level circulation beginning on July 10, and after deep convection formed on the following day, a tropical depression developed around 18:00 UTC about 1,150 mi (1,850 km) east of the Windward Islands. A subtropical ridge north of the depression caused it to move west-northwestward at roughly 17 mph (27 km/h). Vertical wind shear prevented the cyclone from intensifying beyond sustained winds of 30 mph (45 km/h) and an atmospheric pressure of 1,010 mbar (30 inHg), with dissipation occurring late on July 12 approximately 690 mi (1,110 km) east of the Windward Islands. The remnant tropical wave reached the Lesser Antilles on July 13 and July 14.

=== Tropical Storm Barry ===
- Tropical storm (SSHWS)
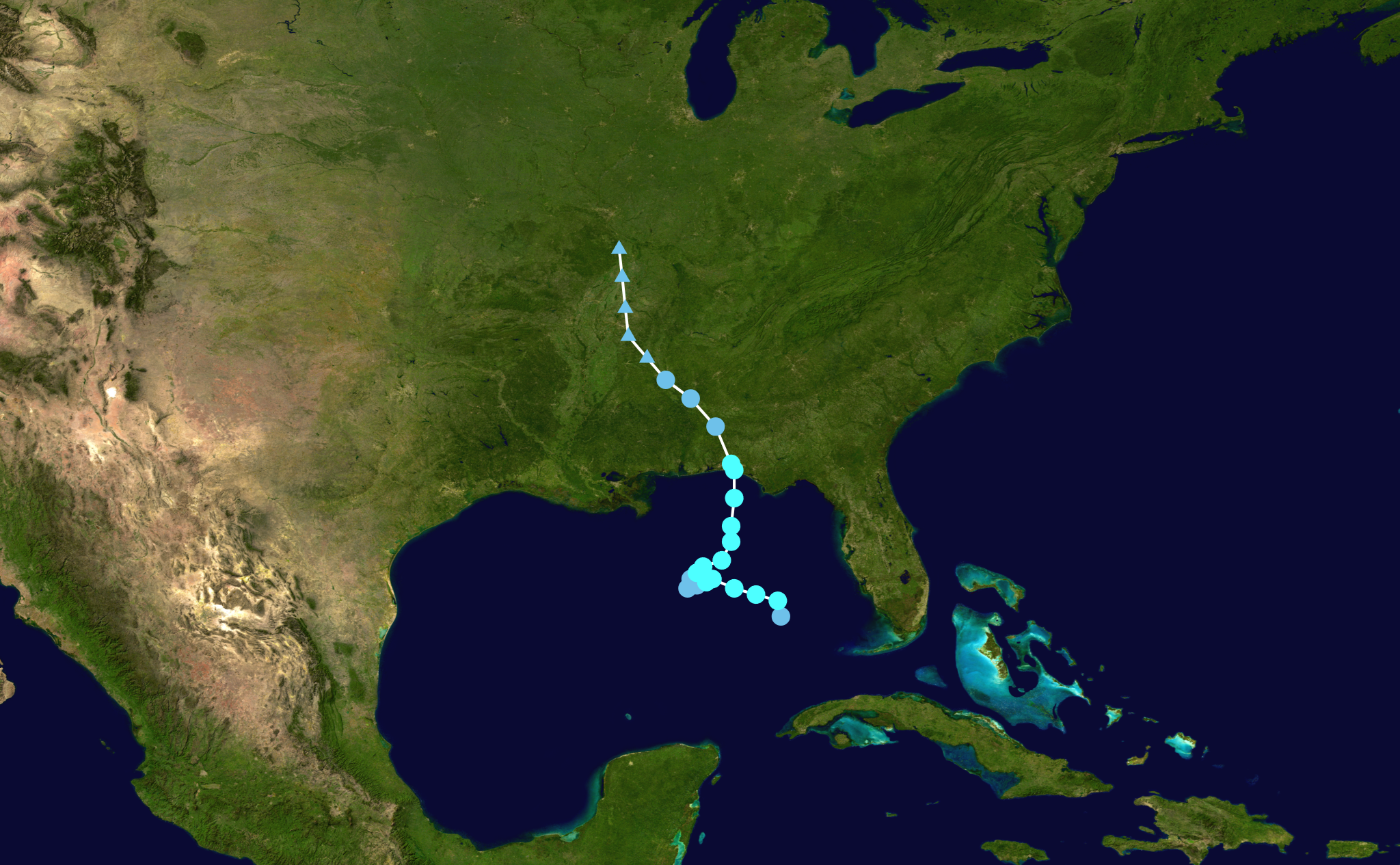
- Duration: August 2 – August 7
- Peak intensity: 70 mph (110 km/h) (1-min); 990 mbar (hPa)

On July 24, a tropical wave moved off the coast of Africa and tracked westward. The wave entered the Caribbean Sea on July 29 and gained in organization and convection, before reaching the Gulf of Mexico on August 1. By the following day, a tropical depression developed about 200 mi (320 km) west-northwest of Key West, Florida, and soon strengthened into Tropical Storm Barry. After fluctuations in intensity, including when it weakened to a tropical depression on August 4, the system attained peak winds of 70 mph (110 km/h) in the Gulf of Mexico late on August 5. Around 05:00 UTC on the next day, Barry made landfall near Santa Rosa Beach, Florida, at the same intensity. The storm weakened to a tropical depression over southern Alabama about seven hours later, before degenerating into a remnant low over Mississippi early on August 7. The remnant low continued north-northwestward until dissipating over Missouri on August 8.

The tropical wave that developed into Barry generated rough seas over the Straits of Florida, capsizing a boat of Cuban refugees, six of whom drowned. Barry's precursor also dropped heavy rain over South Florida, peaking at 11.7 in (300 mm) near Stuart, damaging about 300 homes in Martin County, 69 severely. In the Florida Panhandle, rainfall reached 8.9 in (230 mm) in Tallahassee, and winds gusts topped out at 79 mph (127 km/h). Winds caused damage to some homes and downed trees, while floodwaters inundated streets and entered some cars and structures. Three people in Florida were killed by the storm, and total damage is estimated at $30 million (2001 USD). Several other states in the South reported rainfall.

=== Tropical Storm Chantal ===
- Tropical storm (SSHWS)
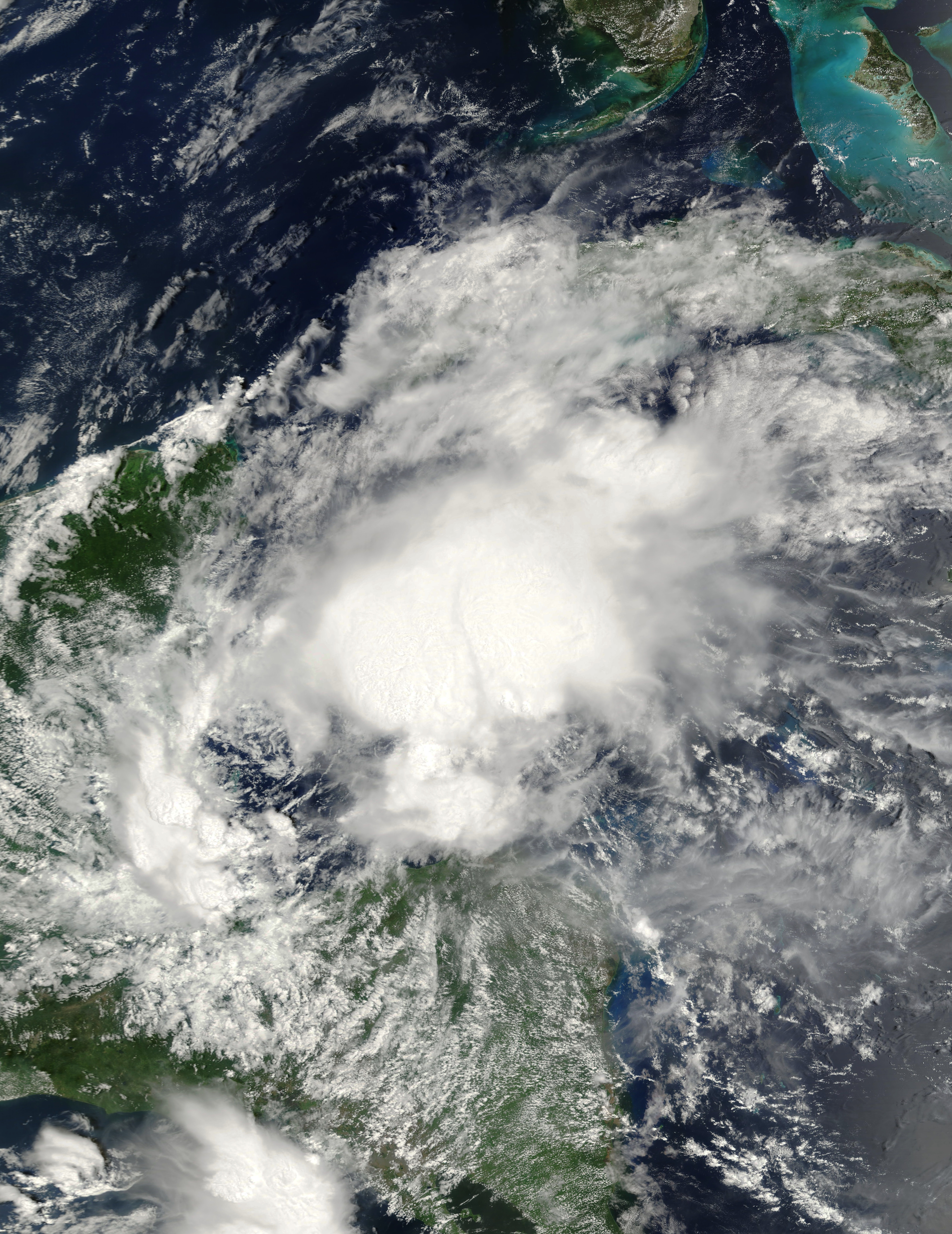
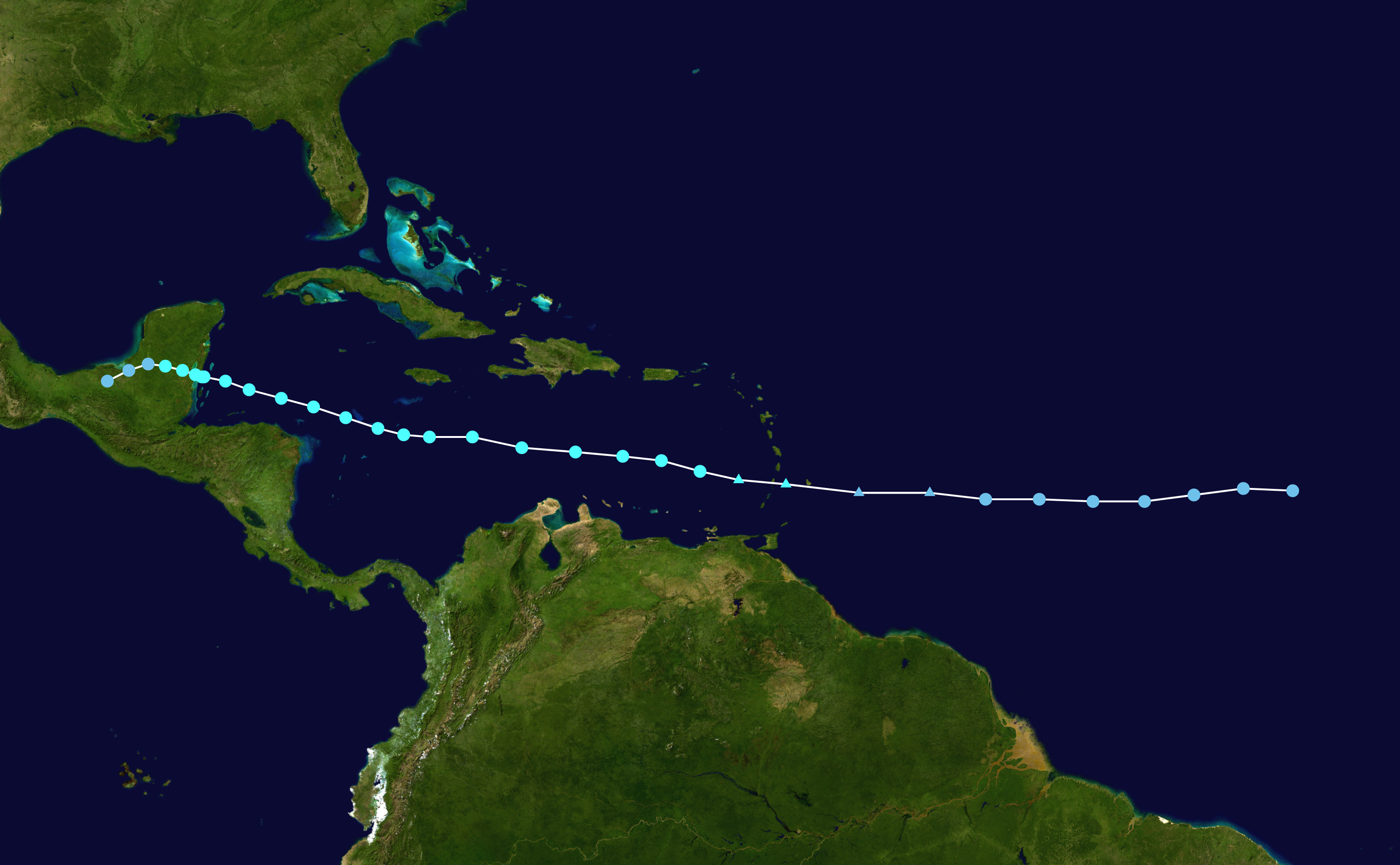
- Duration: August 14 – August 22
- Peak intensity: 70 mph (110 km/h) (1-min); 997 mbar (hPa)

A westward-moving tropical wave organized into a tropical depression about 1,500 mi (2,400 km) east of the Windward Islands on August 14. The depression moved rapidly westward and degenerated into an open wave sometime on August 16 while still well east of the Windward Islands. However, after reaching the southeast Caribbean, a circulation re-developed while the system was situated 290 mi (470 km) south of Saint Croix on August 17. With tropical storm-force winds, the system was reclassified as Tropical Storm Chantal. The cyclone strengthened to reach sustained winds of 70 mph (110 km/h) twice in the Caribbean; Chantal's atmospheric pressure also fell to 997 mbar (29.4 inHg) on August 19. Early on August 21, Chantal made landfall near the Belize–Mexico border with winds of 70 mph (110 km/h). The cyclone weakened to a tropical depression over Campeche on August 22, before dissipating over Tabasco several hours later.

The tropical wave associated with Chantal caused two deaths in Trinidad due to a lightning strike. In Belize, abnormally high tides along the coast damaged piers and seawalls. The storm produced a wind gust of 71 mph (114 km/h) in Caye Caulker, although stronger winds were possible in a convective band to the north. Winds and flooding due to heavy rainfall left damage to agricultural and infrastructural sectors. Overall, Belize suffered nearly $4 million in damage. Heavy rain fell in parts of Mexico, particularly in Quintana Roo, with up to 20.03 in (509 mm) observed at Othón P. Blanco. This led to mudslides, leaving some areas isolated.

=== Tropical Storm Dean ===
- Tropical storm (SSHWS)
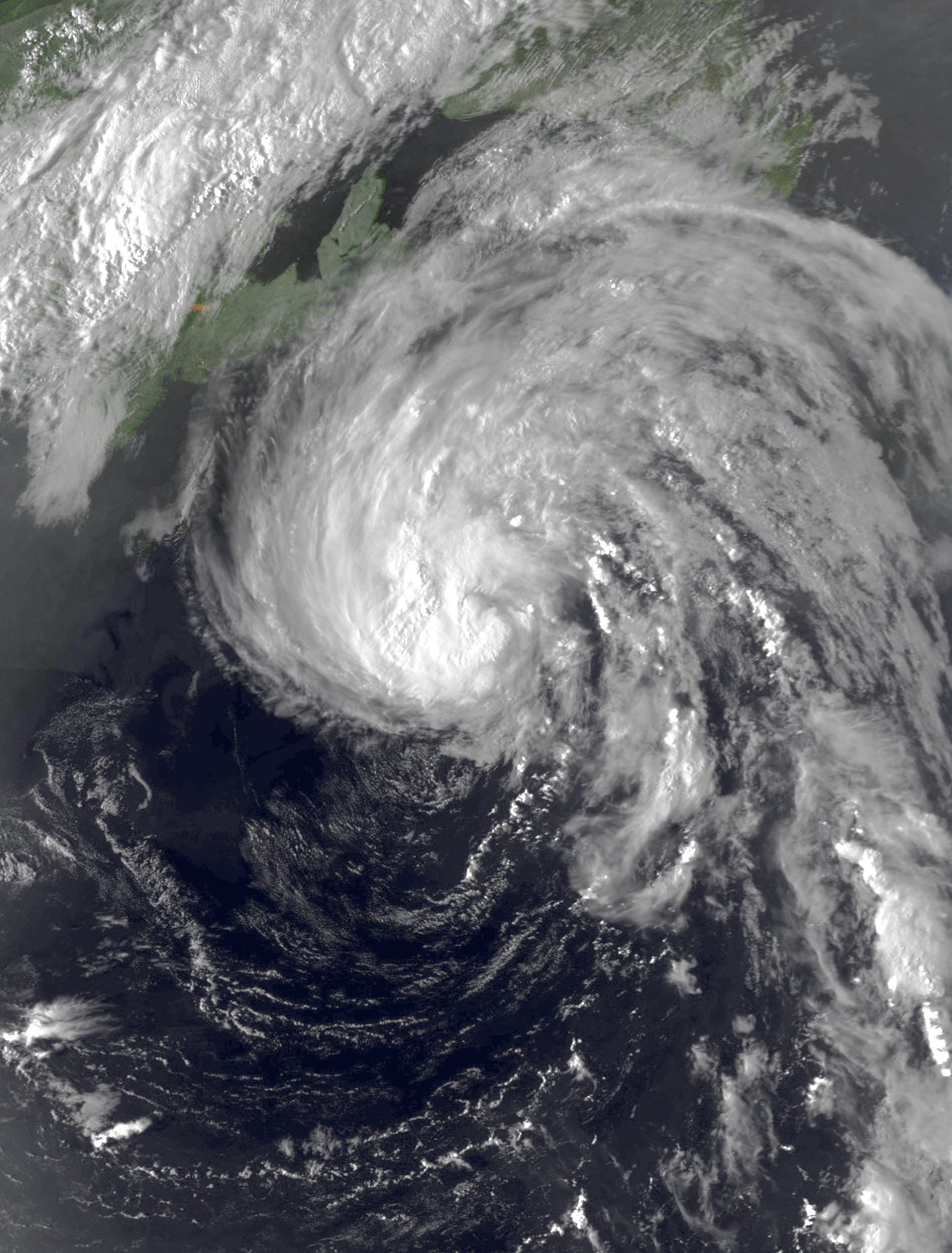
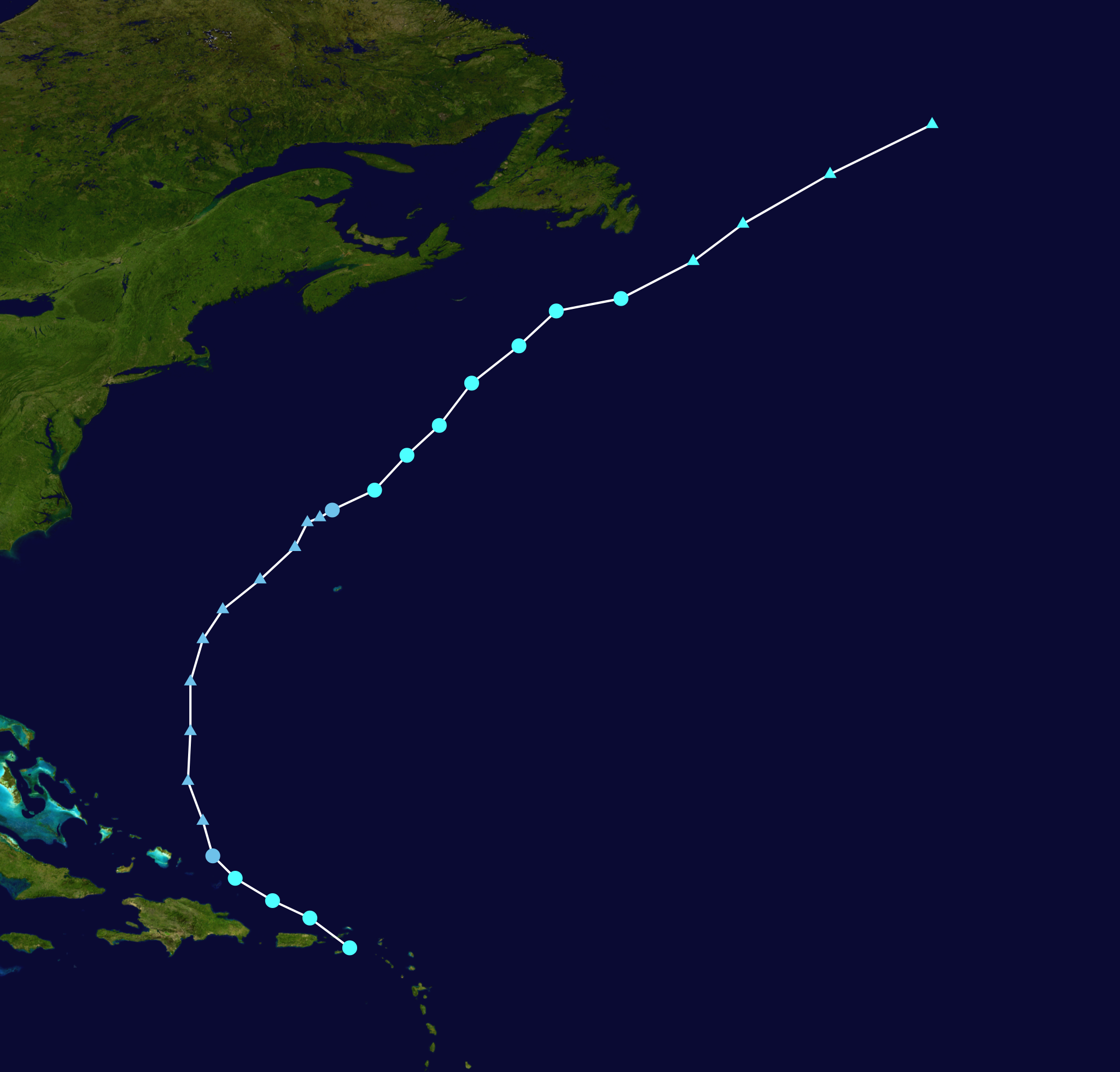
- Duration: August 22 – August 28
- Peak intensity: 70 mph (110 km/h) (1-min); 994 mbar (hPa)

A tropical wave exited western Africa between August 14–15. Moving westward, the wave gradually developed thunderstorms, although unfavorable upper-level wind shear prevented rapid development. Late on August 21, the wave passed through the northern Lesser Antilles, and the convection became better organized after the wind shear dropped. On August 22, Tropical Storm Dean developed near Saint Croix, reaching winds of 60 mph (95 km/h) later that day. It moved quickly northwestward due to a ridge to its northeast. Strong wind shear caused the circulation to dissipate on August 23, east of the Bahamas. The remnants of Dean turned to the north, and became embedded within a large mid-level trough off the East Coast of the United States. Convection increased around the system early on August 24 and gradually became more organized. The disturbance passed west of Bermuda early on August 25, and subsequently turned to the northeast. The remnants of Dean redeveloped into a tropical depression on August 26, about 220 miles (350 km) north of Bermuda. It soon restrengthened into a tropical storm, which developed an eye feature in the convection. Dean reached peak winds of 70 mph (110 km/h) late on August 27 while located about 465 miles (748 km) southwest of Cape Race, Newfoundland. Weakening over cooler waters, Dean became extratropical on August 28 about 145 miles (233 km) east-southeast of Cape Race, Newfoundland. The extratropical storm continued northeastward until being absorbed by a frontal low on August 29.

The precursor disturbance to Dean dropped heavy rainfall on Saint Martin of around 5 inches (130 mm). In the United States Virgin Islands, the precursor disturbance produced 1.07 inches (27 mm) of rain in Saint Thomas, with gusts to 48 mph (77 km/h). Power outages occurred throughout the territory. There was minor flooding on Saint Croix. Some roads were damaged in Saint John. Dean dropped heavy rainfall across Puerto Rico, peaking at 12.7 inches (320 mm) in Salinas. Damage across the island totaled $7.7 million. Wind gusts reached 36 mph (58 km/h) at Roosevelt Roads Naval Station. The passage of Dean resulted in widespread flooding in eastern and southern Puerto Rico, collapsing two bridges and one road. Several highways were under water, and one car was swept away by the floodwaters, although the four occupants were rescued. Throughout the island, about 1,320 houses were flooded, and two houses experienced collapsed roofs. Additionally, over 16,000 households lost electricity and more than 130 people fled low-lying areas as rivers swelled. Two people were injured in Peñuelas, and three were injured in Nagüabo when the ceiling of a day care center collapsed. 17 flights were canceled, and a cruise line altered its path. The remnants of Dean produced unsettled conditions across Bermuda, including a wind gust of 41 mph (66 km/h) and light rainfall of 0.31 inches (7.9 mm). In Newfoundland, Dean produced wind gusts of 63 mph (101 km/h), with a peak rainfall of 4.2 inches (110 mm).

=== Hurricane Erin ===
- Category 3 hurricane (SSHWS)
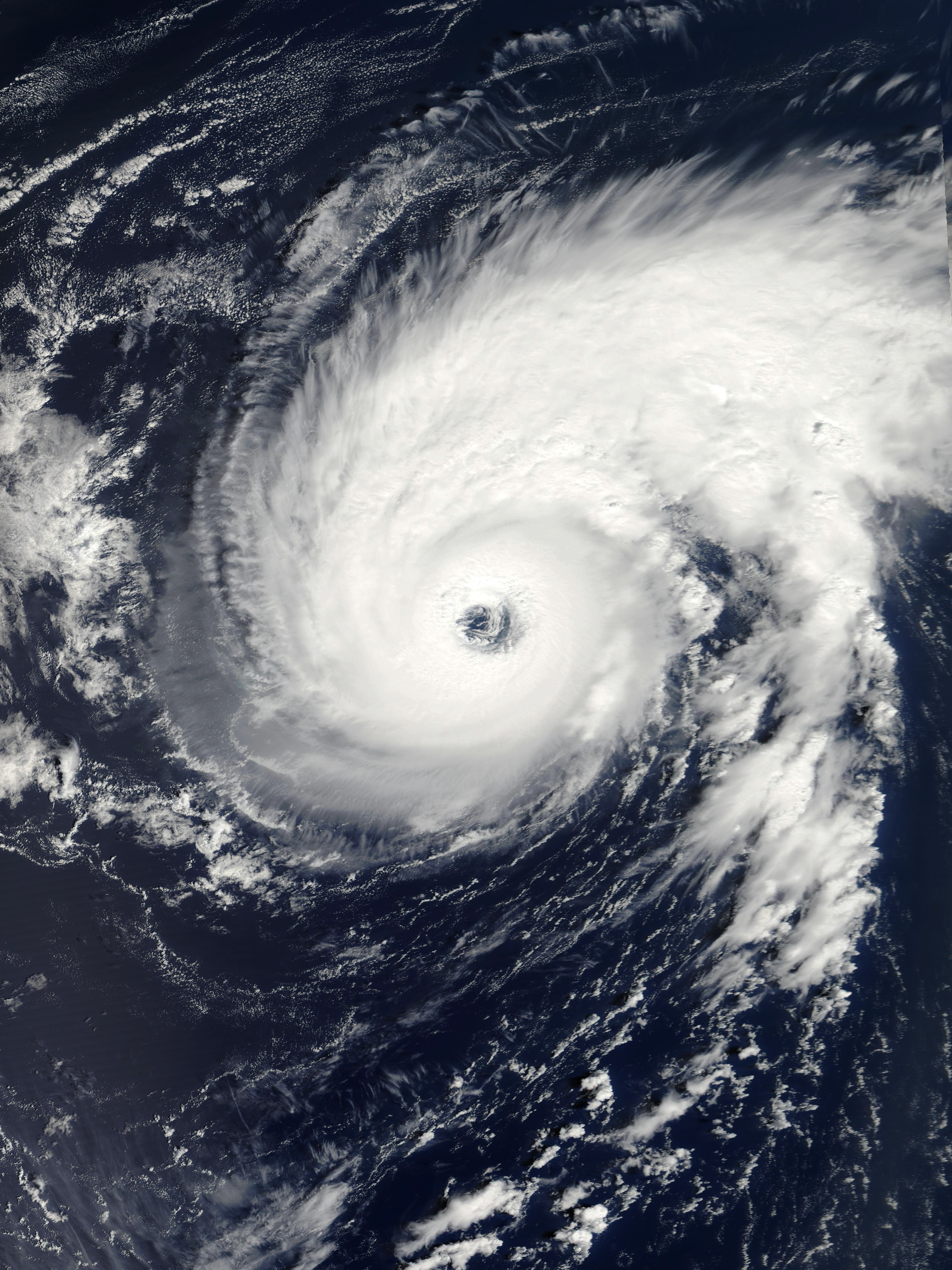
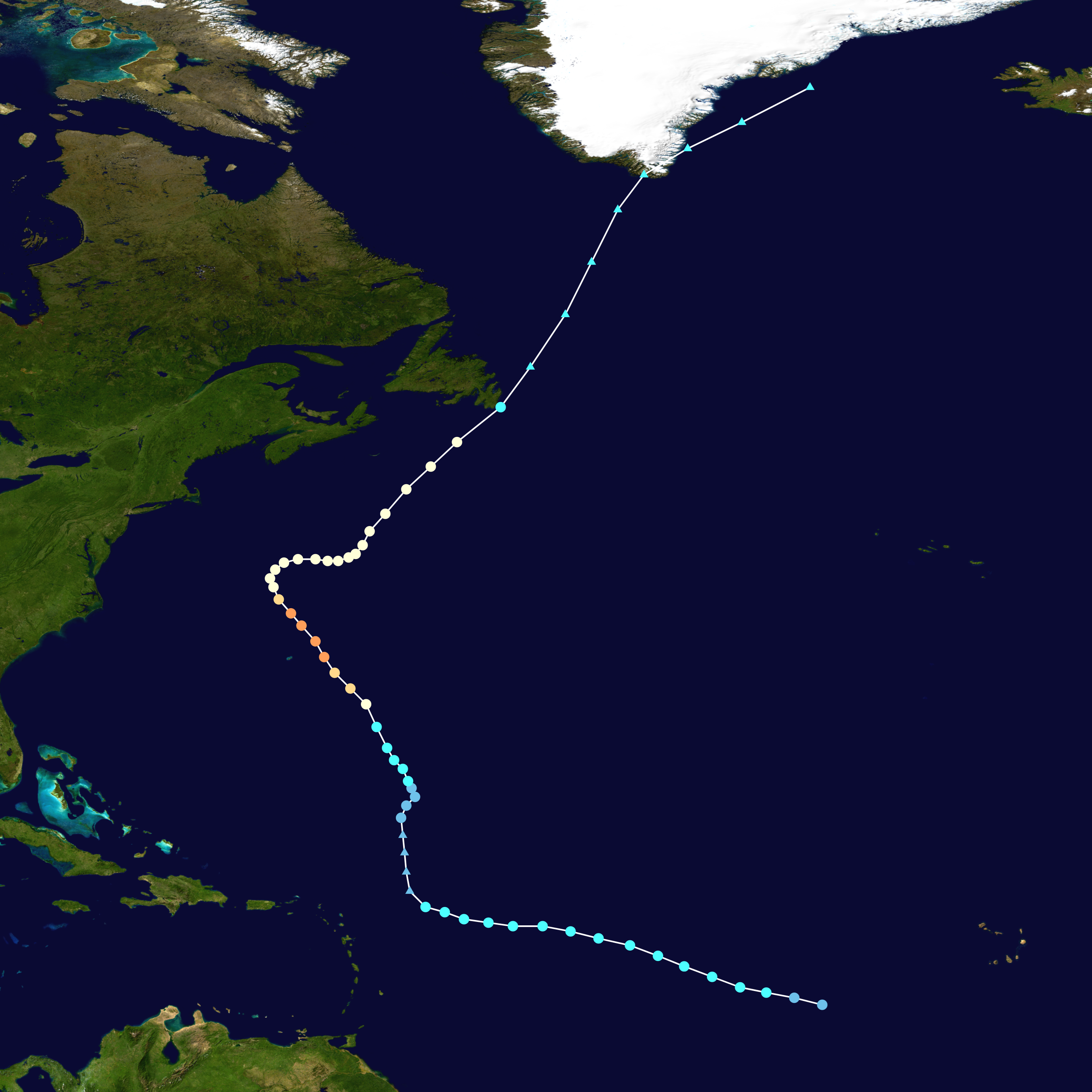
- Duration: September 1 – September 15
- Peak intensity: 120 mph (195 km/h) (1-min); 968 mbar (hPa)

A tropical wave moved off the coast of Africa on August 30. It quickly showed signs of organization, with curved rainbands and deep convection. Late on September 1, Tropical Depression Six developed about 1,600 miles (2,600 km) east of the Lesser Antilles. The depression moved to the west-northwest, steered by a ridge to the north. On September 2, it strengthened into Tropical Storm Erin, despite the presence of wind shear. Erin reached an initial peak intensity of 60 mph (97 km/h) on September 3. An increase in wind shear caused Erin to weaken back to tropical depression status on September 5, causing the circulation to dissipate. The remnants continued to the northwest, and Erin redeveloped into a tropical depression late on September 6, about 365 miles (587 km) north-northwest of where it previously dissipated. It regained tropical storm status on September 7, and it became better organized. On September 9, Erin intensified into a hurricane while located 104 miles (167 km) east-northeast of Bermuda, and a 40-mile (64 km) wide eye developed. Erin quickly strengthened later that day to reach a peak intensity of 120 mph (190 km/h) and a minimum central pressure of 968 mbar (28.6 inHg). Shortly after reaching its peak intensity, Erin passed 105 miles (169 km) east-northeast of Bermuda, its closest approach to the island. The hurricane maintained peak strength for 18 hours, before slowly weakening. Erin turned to the east on September 11, after the ridge to its north weakened, before accelerating northeastward. On September 15, Erin weakened to tropical storm status as it passed just east of Cape Race, Newfoundland. Shortly thereafter, Erin transitioned into an extratropical cyclone, which crossed over southern Greenland on September 16. A day later, the remnants of Erin merged with another storm east of Greenland.

Tropical cyclone warnings and watches were issued for Bermuda beginning on September 8, which were discontinued two days later after the storm bypassed the island. The hurricane caused ferries, cruise lines, cargo ships, and bus transport to be suspended. Several flights were canceled at Bermuda International Airport, stranding hundreds of travelers. A school was prepared as a shelter. Winds on the island reached 41 mph (66 km/h). The winds downed several trees onto power lines, leaving dozens of homes without power for several hours. Prolonged durations of strong waves resulted in coastal beach erosion. Large waves broke a boat from its moorings. Swells from Erin produced rip currents along the North Carolina coastline. While Erin was off the east coast of the United States on September 11, its wind flow blew smoke from the fallen Twin Towers southward toward Brooklyn. Later, Erin produced 67 mph (108 km/h) wind gusts at Cape Race, Newfoundland. Rainfall reached 5.1 inches (130 mm) at Sagona Island. Along the coast, the passage of the storm led to wave heights of up to 30 feet (9.1 m).

=== Hurricane Felix ===
- Category 3 hurricane (SSHWS)
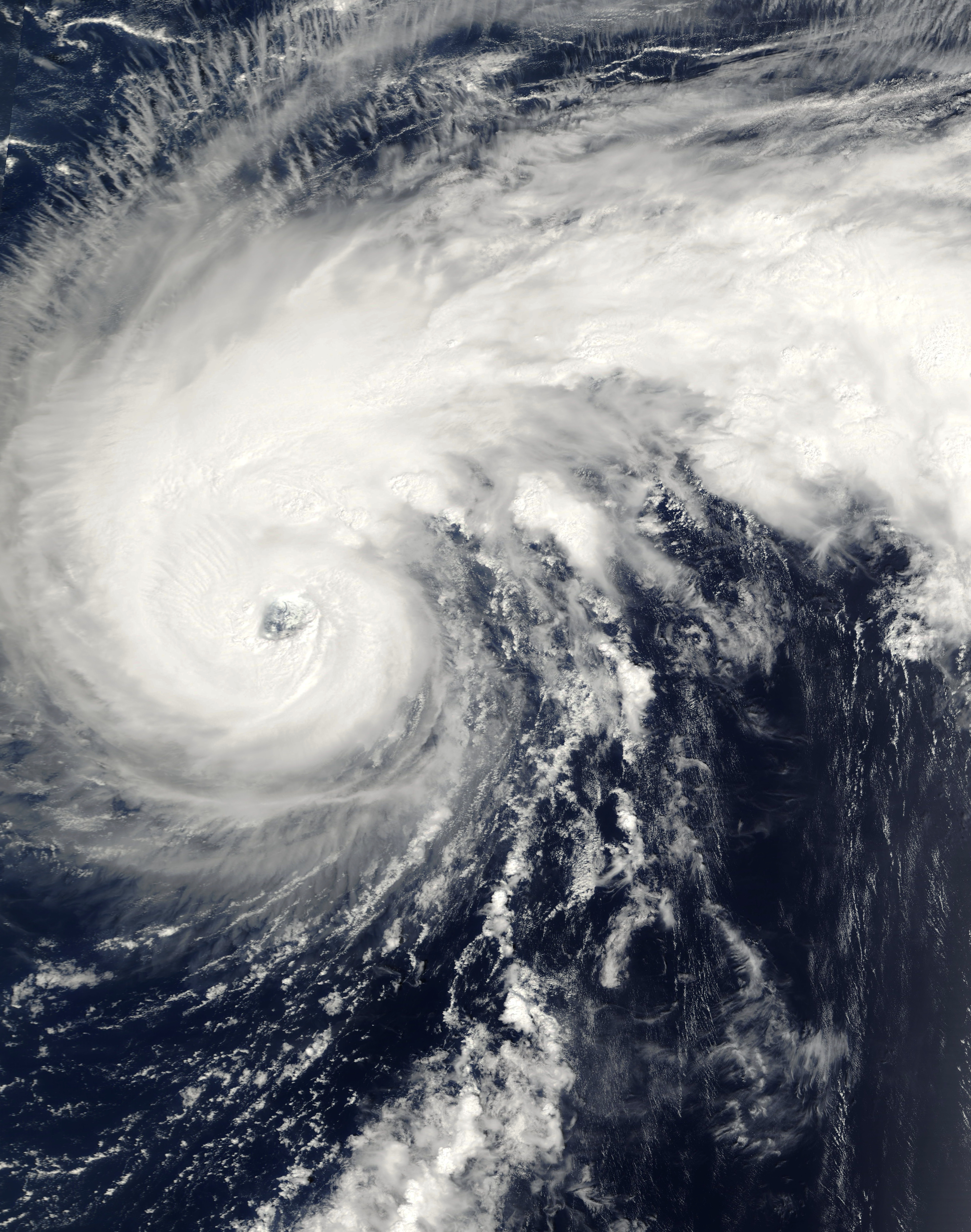
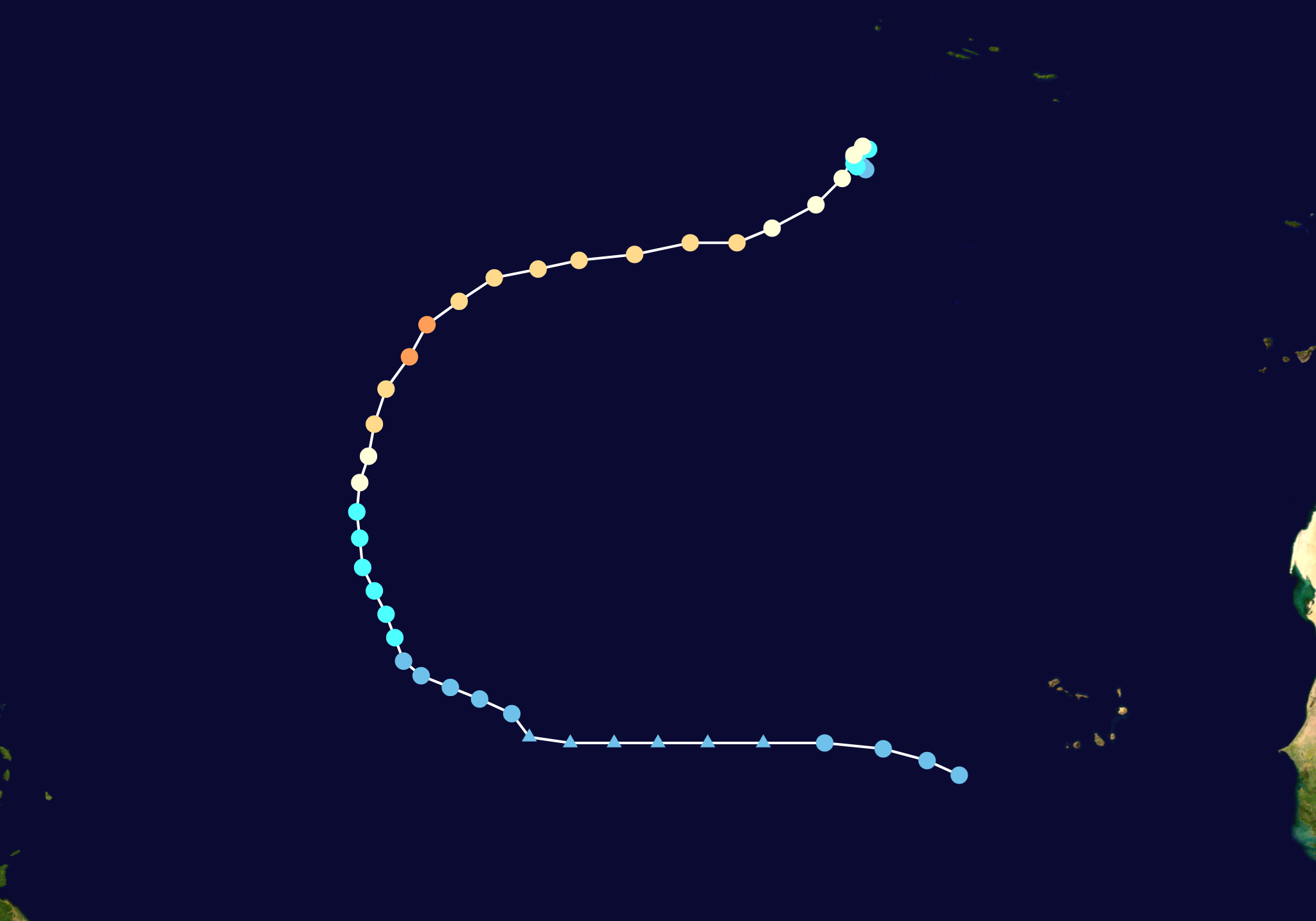
- Duration: September 7 – September 19
- Peak intensity: 115 mph (185 km/h) (1-min); 962 mbar (hPa)

On September 5, a tropical wave and an associated surface low emerged into the Atlantic from the west coast of Africa. Tracking westward, the wave and low acquired a better defined circulation and more concentrated deep convection. Consequently, satellite imagery indicated that a tropical depression developed approximately 415 mi (670 km) southwest of the Cabo Verde Islands around 18:00 UTC on September 7. However, possibly due to the cyclone's fairly quick westward motion – 21 to 23 mph (34 to 37 km/h) – and a more stable atmospheric environment, the depression struggled to maintain deep convection and degenerated into a tropical wave about 24 hours. The wave also encountered strong wind shear, but soon experienced more favorable conditions, leading to the redevelopment of convection closer to the center starting on September 9.

Early on September 10, the wave regenerated into a tropical depression about 1,145 mi (1,845 km) east of the Lesser Antilles, and intensified into Tropical Storm Felix the next day while tracking generally northward. By September 13, it intensified into a hurricane, and subsequently it underwent rapid deepening, becoming a major hurricane on September 14 with peak winds of 115 mph (185 km/h) and a minimum pressure of 962 mbar (28.4 inHg). By that time, Felix had turned to the northeast, and subsequently entered an area of unfavorable conditions. The hurricane gradually weakened, deteriorating to a tropical storm on September 17. Cool waters and higher wind shear caused additional weakening while Felix nearly stalled to the southwest of the Azores. Late on September 18, the storm weakened to a tropical depression, and early the next day Felix dissipated roughly 400 mi (645 km) southwest of the islands.

=== Hurricane Gabrielle ===
- Category 1 hurricane (SSHWS)
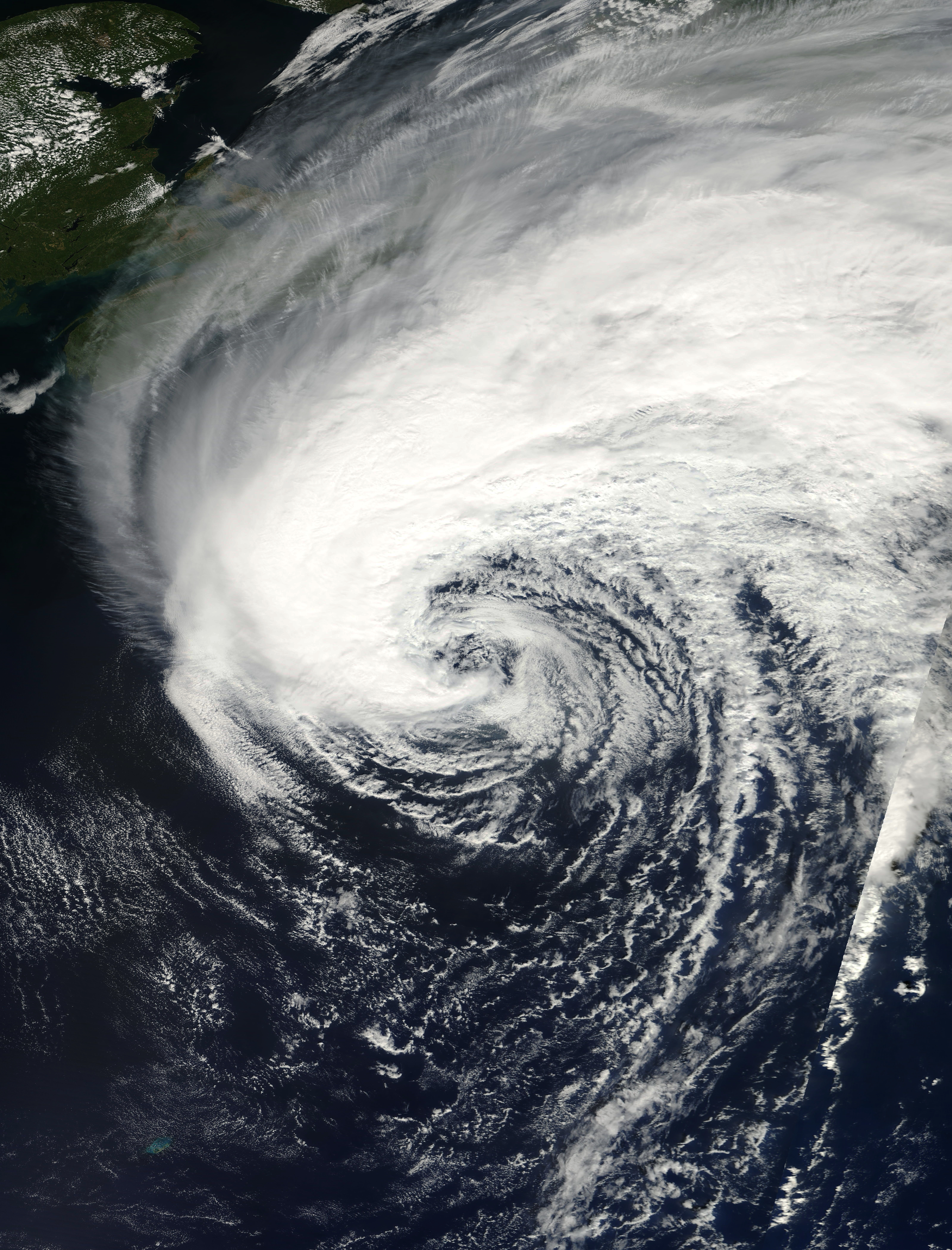
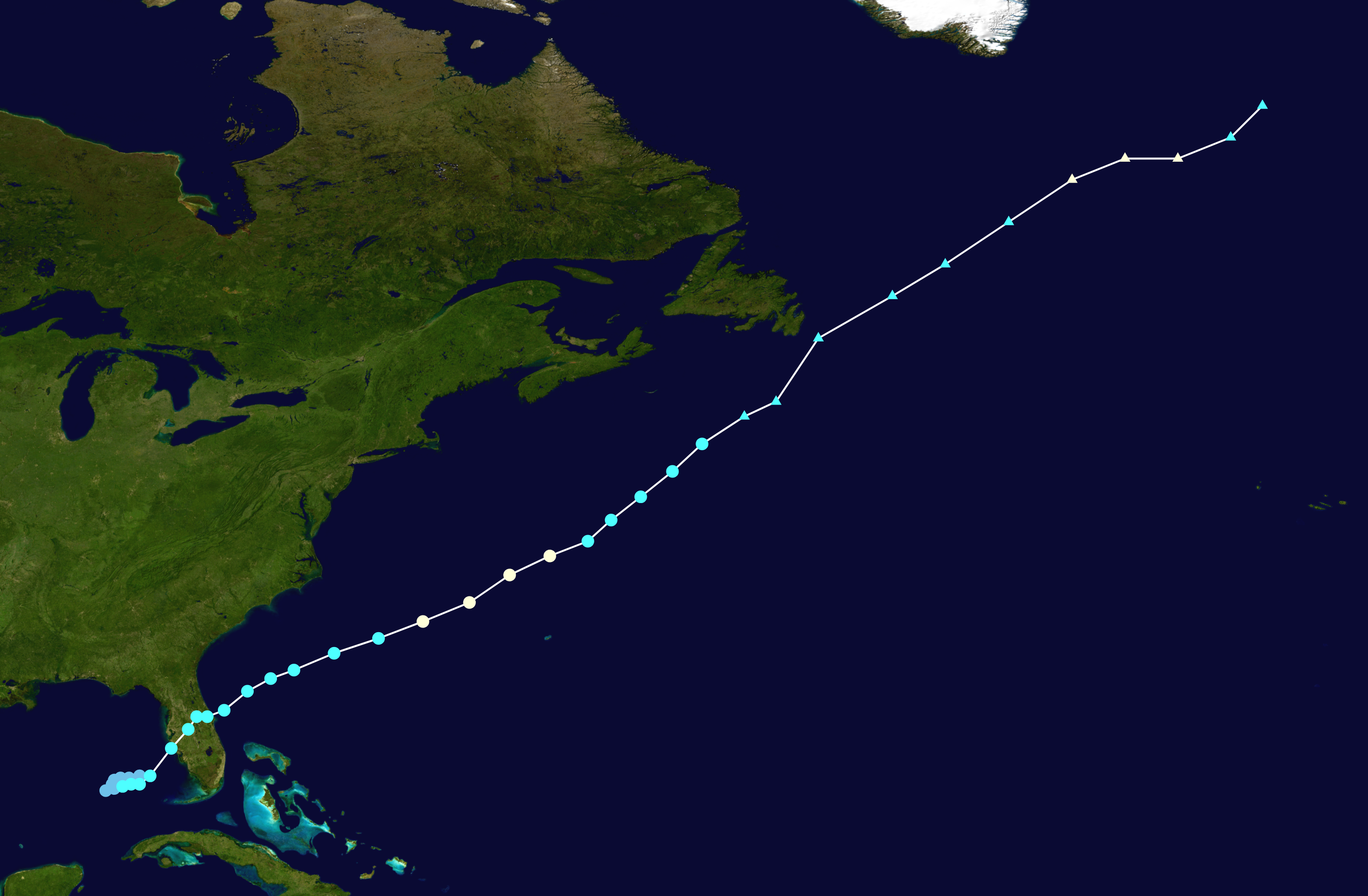
- Duration: September 11 – September 19
- Peak intensity: 80 mph (130 km/h) (1-min); 975 mbar (hPa)

A nearly stationary weak low- to mid-level trough offshore the Southeastern United States spawned a cut-off low on September 9, which generated a surface low. Late on September 11, the surface low organized into a tropical depression about 145 mi (235 km) west-southwest of Naples, Florida. The depression drifted west-southwest and slowly intensified, before turning east-northeastward and strengthening into Tropical Storm Gabrielle on September 13. Gabrielle curved northeastward and struck near Venice, Florida, on the following day with winds of 70 mph (115 km/h). After weakening slightly, Gabrielle emerged into the Atlantic near Titusville on September 15, accelerated northeastward, and strengthened, becoming a hurricane two days later. Gabrielle peaked with winds of 80 mph (130 km/h) and a minimum pressure of 975 mbar (28.8 inHg) before colder seas weakened it to a tropical storm on September 18. The storm became extratropical on September 19 roughly 345 mi (555 km) south of Newfoundland, but the remnants continued northeastward until being absorbed by a larger extratropical low over the far north Atlantic on September 21.

Gabrielle produced moderate winds along coastal areas of western Florida, reaching 58 mph (93 km/h) at Venice. The tide flooded the northern shoreline of Charlotte Harbor and at the entrance to the Peace River, while further to the south a surge of greater than 3 ft (0.91 m) inundated the barrier island at Fort Myers Beach and flooded some cars. Abnormally high tides inflicted at least minor damage to approximately 600 homes in Lee County alone. Heavy rains fell in parts of Florida, with water entering some homes near Palm Beach Gardens. The storm caused three deaths and $230 million in damage in the United States. Gabrielle brushed the eastern coast of Newfoundland; the rainfall set the all time six-hour precipitation record at St. John's, with a total of 3.54 in (90 mm). Hundreds of homes and buildings were damaged by the passage of Gabrielle, totaling several million Canadian dollars in damage.

=== Tropical Depression Nine ===
- Tropical depression (SSHWS)
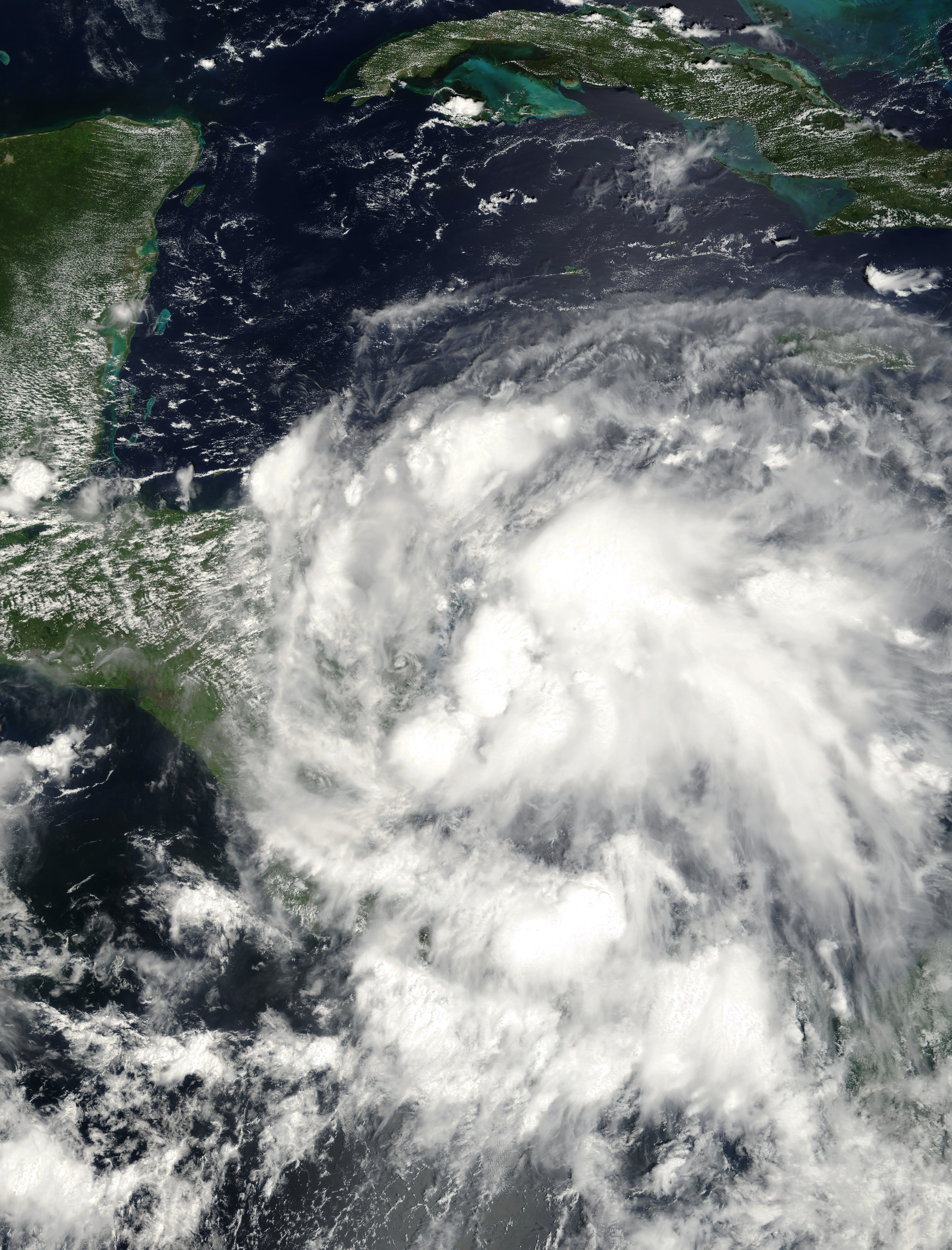
- Duration: September 19 – September 20
- Peak intensity: 35 mph (55 km/h) (1-min); 1005 mbar (hPa)

A tropical wave emerged into the Atlantic from the west coast of Africa on September 11. The wave reached the Caribbean on September 16 and began organizing and acquiring convection a few days later. Tropical Depression Nine developed on September 19 approximately 60 mi (95 km) north-northwest of Colombia's San Andres Island. The cyclone peaked with winds of 35 mph (55 km/h) and a minimum pressure of 1,005 mbar (29.7 inHg), and made landfall near Puerto Cabezas, Nicaragua, on September 20. After losing its closed circulation over land, it reformed into Hurricane Juliette in the East Pacific.

Nicaragua observed precipitation up to 1.8 in (46 mm) in Bluefields, while mountainous areas were estimated to have experienced 5.9 in (150 mm) rain. In El Salvador, heavy rains from the depression helped alleviate drought conditions; however, flooding also inundated 200 homes in San Salvador along the Acelhuate River. Fifteen farms were inundated by flooding, five of which were destroyed. Seventy people evacuated to shelters set up after the storm by the local Red Cross and armed forces. Military crews were quickly deployed to help clean up the damages on September 22.

=== Hurricane Humberto ===
- Category 2 hurricane (SSHWS)
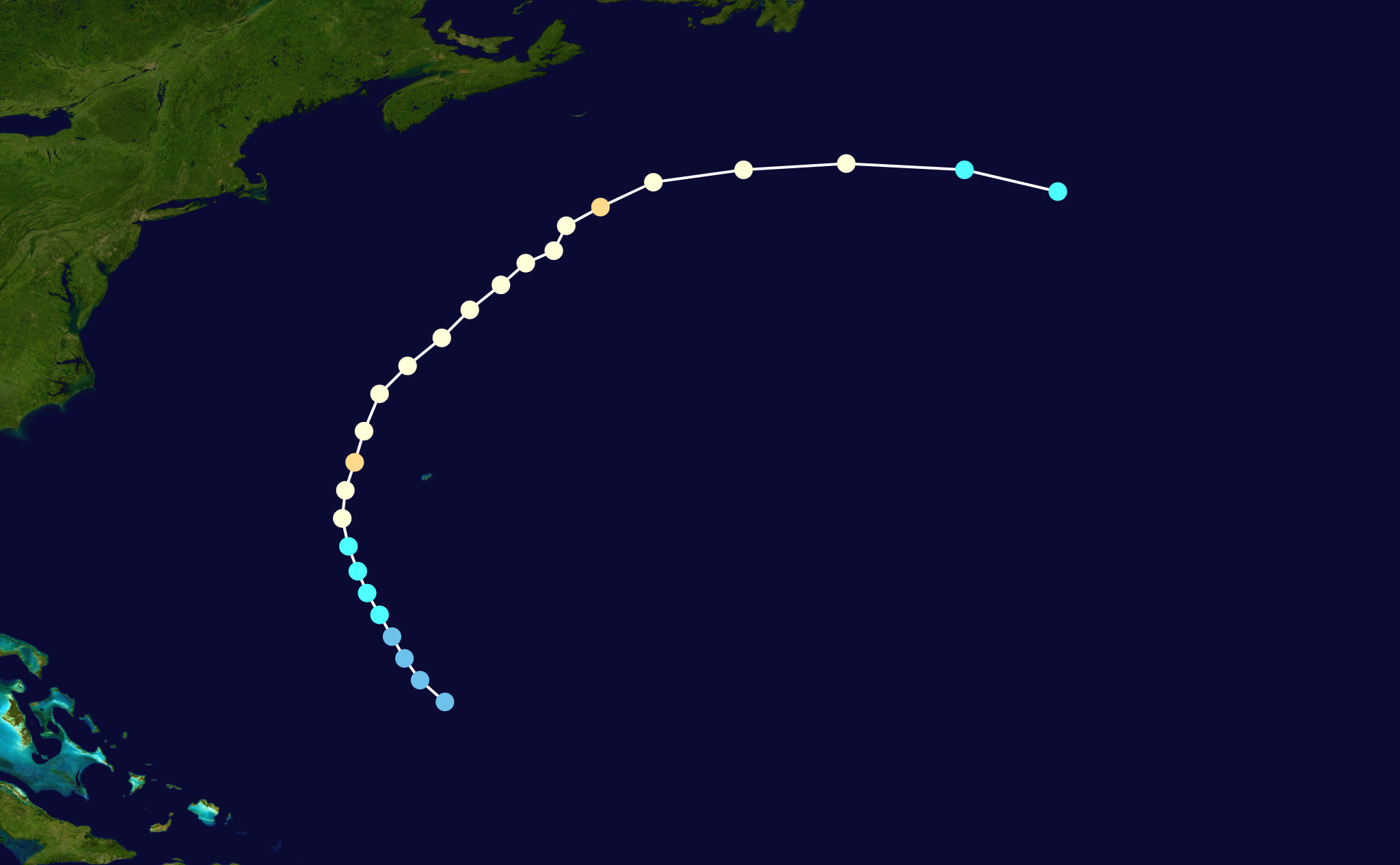
- Duration: September 21 – September 27
- Peak intensity: 105 mph (165 km/h) (1-min); 970 mbar (hPa)

After Gabrielle moved across the western Atlantic, a trough extended southwestward from the storm, which interacted with an upper-level low on September 18. This generated a surface low the following day, which developed into a tropical depression on September 21 about halfway between Puerto Rico and Bermuda. A day later it strengthened into Tropical Storm Humberto. Moving around the subtropical ridge, its track became more northerly as Humberto intensified further. After developing an eye feature, Humberto attained hurricane status on September 23. After passing Bermuda that day, Humberto briefly became a Category 2 hurricane on September 24, but weakened due to an increase in wind shear, falling to minimal hurricane intensity. Accelerating northeastward, the hurricane became aligned with the wind shear as it slowed slightly. Humberto restrengthened on September 26, reaching peak winds of 105 mph (165 km/h) and a minimum pressure of 970 mi (1,560 km). Cooler waters and stronger wind shear caused Humberto to weaken again, as the convection became asymmetrical. On September 27, Humberto degenerated into an open trough about 560 mi (900 km) southeast of Newfoundland.

There were three major aircraft flights into the hurricane over a three-day period which, according to NASA, "were the most comprehensive measurements of the structure of the hurricane ever recorded." The flights were designed to obtain data for better hurricane forecasting. Some higher surf was recorded along the New Jersey coastline. In September 2001, two men sought to break the record for sailing the quickest time from New York City to Melbourne, Australia; Humberto disrupted their early path slightly, but they ultimately broke the record by 28 hours. While making its closest approach to Bermuda, the island recorded wind gusts of 43 mph (69 km/h) and light rainfall reaching 1.69 in (43 mm).

=== Hurricane Iris ===
- Category 4 hurricane (SSHWS)
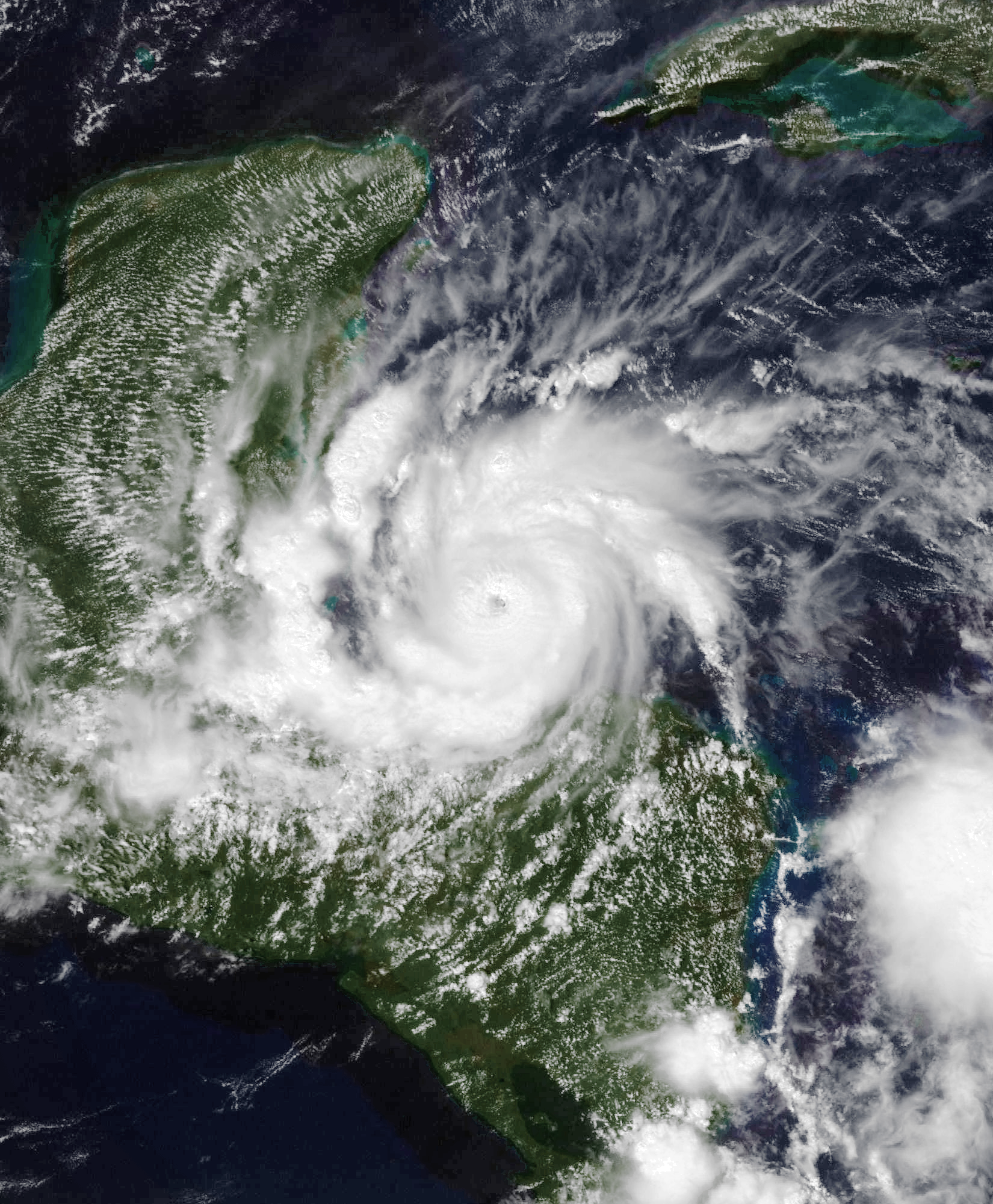
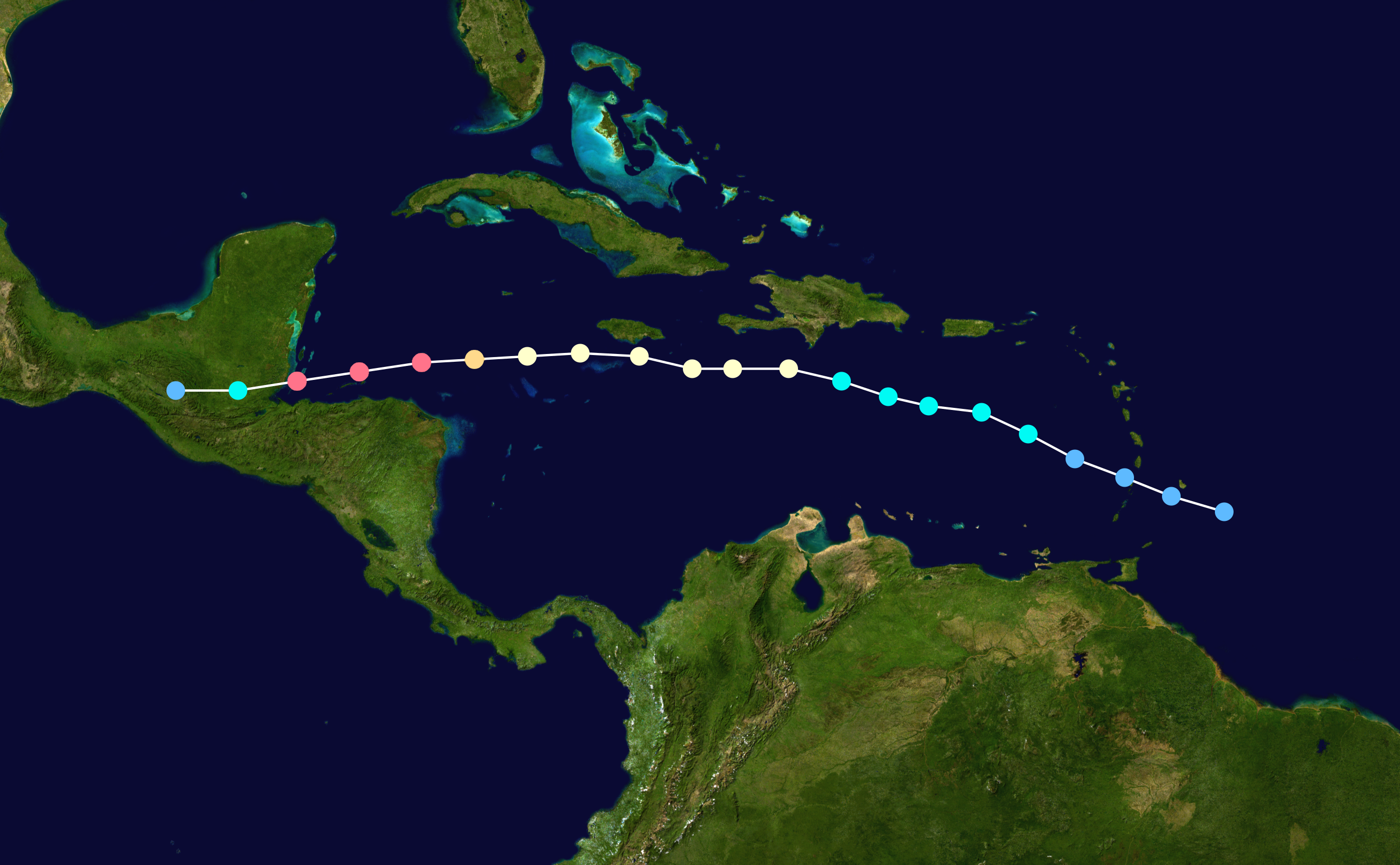
- Duration: October 4 – October 9
- Peak intensity: 145 mph (230 km/h) (1-min); 948 mbar (hPa)

A tropical wave emerged into the Atlantic from the west coast of Africa in late September. The wave moved generally westward across the Atlantic and organized into Tropical Depression Eleven approximately 90 mi (145 km) southeast of Barbados on October 4. It traveled across the Windward Islands, and intensified into Tropical Storm Iris while over the eastern Caribbean on October 5. Iris continued to the west and intensified. After passing just south of Jamaica, Iris reached Category 4 hurricane strength on October 8 to the north of Honduras. Around 02:00 UTC on October 9, the hurricane made landfall near Monkey River Town, Belize, with peak winds of 145 mph (230 km/h) and a minimum pressure of 948 mbar (28.0 inHg). Iris rapidly weakened and dissipated over extreme southeastern Mexico several hours later. Although Iris's circulation dissipated, its remnants contributed to the development of Tropical Storm Manuel in the eastern Pacific Ocean on October 10.

Rainfall from the outerbands of Iris caused flooding in the Dominican Republic, resulting in the evacuation of 35 families after rivers exceeded their banks. Three people died when a landslide destroyed a home in Santo Domingo. Iris destroyed two homes and deroofed two others in Jamaica. The storm produced an 8 to 15 ft (2.4 to 4.6 m) storm surge along the coast of Belize. A total of 3,718 homes were either damaged or destroyed, mostly in the Stann Creek and Toledo districts, rendering about 15,000 people homeless. Severe losses to agriculture was also reported, including the destruction of 5,000 acres (2,000 hectares) of bananas, 3,500 acres (1,400 hectares) of rice, and 3,000 acres (1,200 hectares) of corn. Iris caused 24 deaths in Belize – with 20 occurring when the dive boat Wave Dancer capsized near Big Creek – and at least $250 million in damage. Flash floods and mudslides in Guatemala damaged 2,500 homes and 26 schools and killed 8 people. In Mexico, flooding due to heavy rains from Iris damaged 120 homes in Oaxaca and caused 2 deaths.

=== Tropical Storm Jerry ===
- Tropical storm (SSHWS)
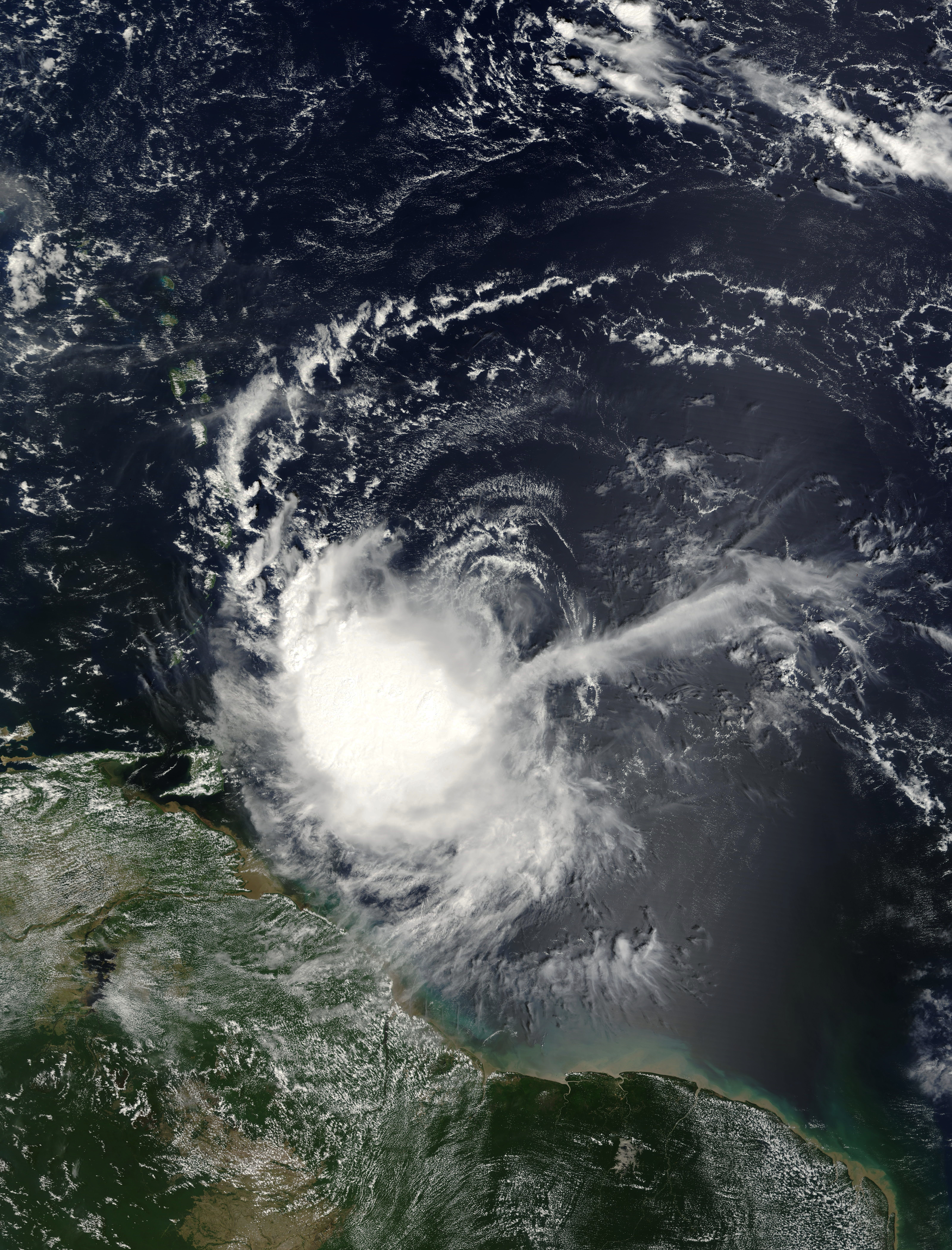
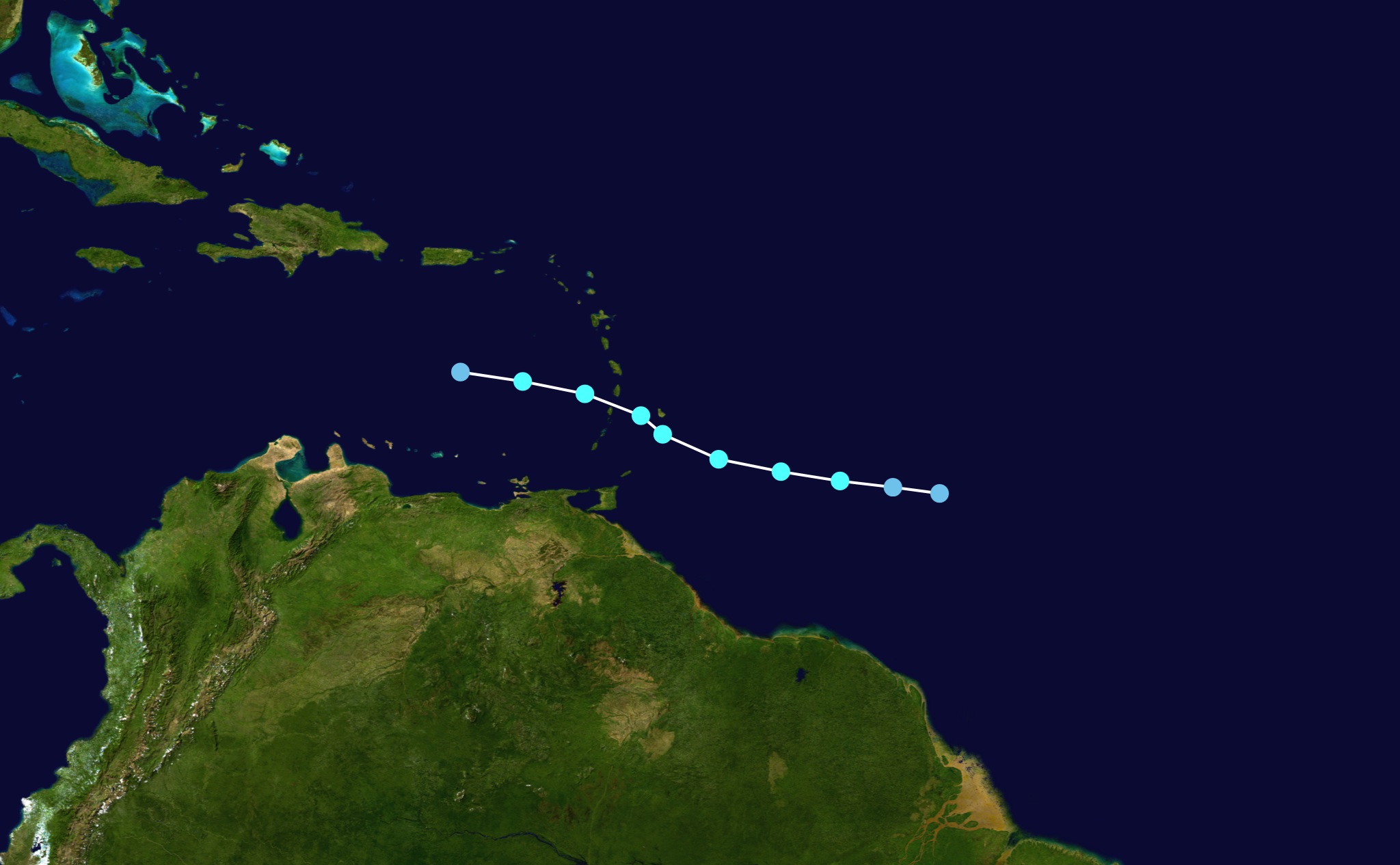
- Duration: October 6 – October 8
- Peak intensity: 50 mph (85 km/h) (1-min); 1004 mbar (hPa)

A westward-moving tropical wave organized into Tropical Depression Twelve on October 6 about 620 mi (1,000 km) east-southeast of Barbados. The depression strengthened into Tropical Storm Jerry early on October 7, aided by low wind shear. Continuing westward due to a ridge to its north, Jerry passed just south of Barbados with winds of 50 mph (85 km/h) early on October 8. Reconnaissance aircraft indicated a possible reformation of the center, as data indicated multiple low-level rotations on a northeast to southwest axis. After bypassing Saint Vincent at 03:00 UTC on October 8, Jerry's atmospheric pressure decreased to 1,004 mbar (29.6 inHg) and its forward speed increased to 25 mph (40 km/h). However, moderate vertical wind shear soon disrupted the storm's upper-level outflow, leading to weakening, despite forecast models indicating that the system could reach hurricane status within a few days. Later on October 8, aircraft data indicated the system had weakened into a broad area of low pressure with scattered squalls mainly to the east of the remnant center. Jerry then dissipated shortly afterward approximately 230 mi (370 km) south of Puerto Rico, with the remnants moving westward.

The threat of the storm prompted tropical storm warnings and watches in the Lesser Antilles. Jerry caused minimal damage as it moved through the Windward Islands and Lesser Antilles. A station at Martinique reported sustained ten-minute winds of 44 mph (71 km/h) on October 8. Some downpours and high winds were reported. Barbados observed a minimum pressure of 1,007 mbar (29.7 inHg).

=== Hurricane Karen ===
- Category 1 hurricane (SSHWS)
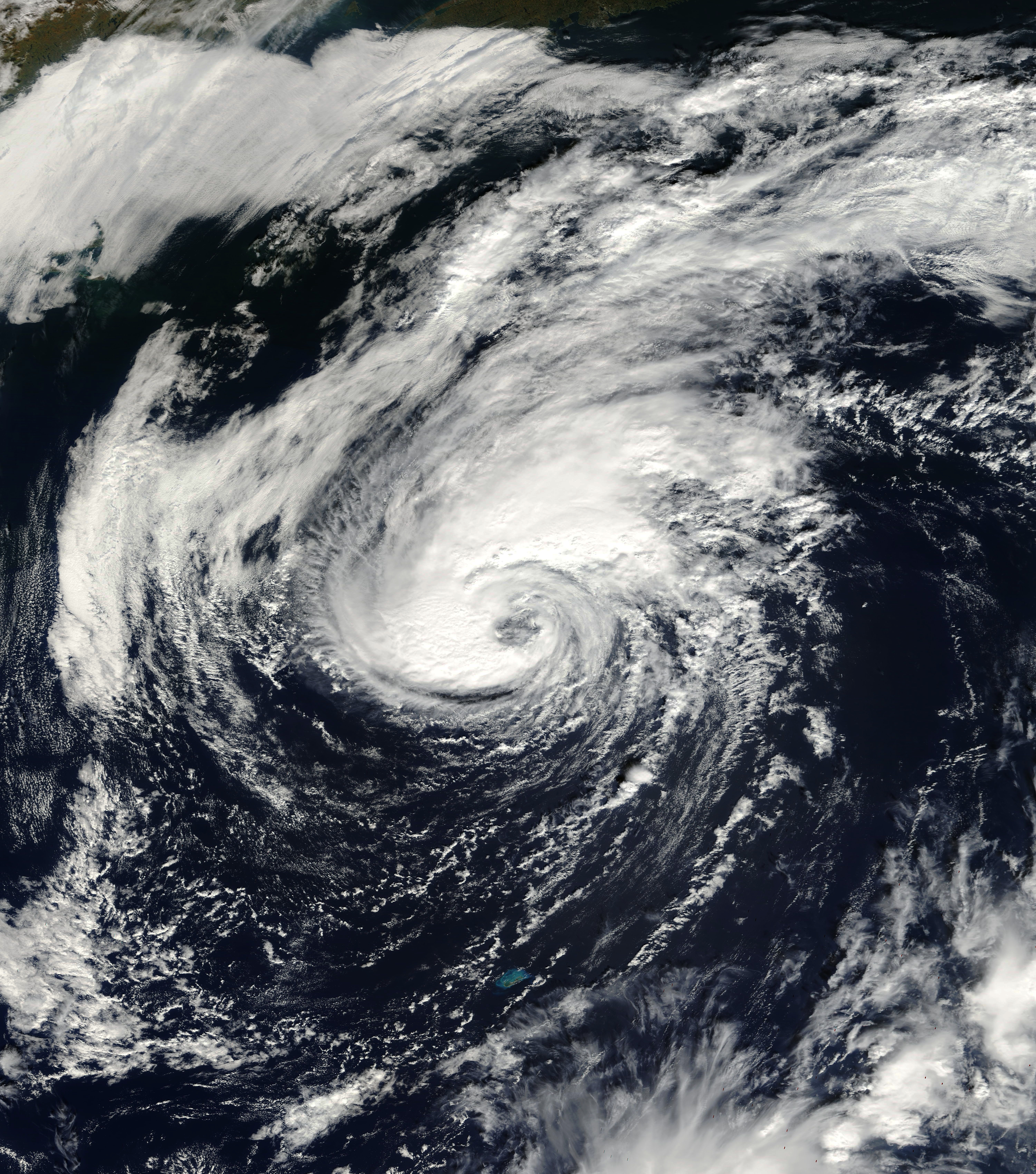
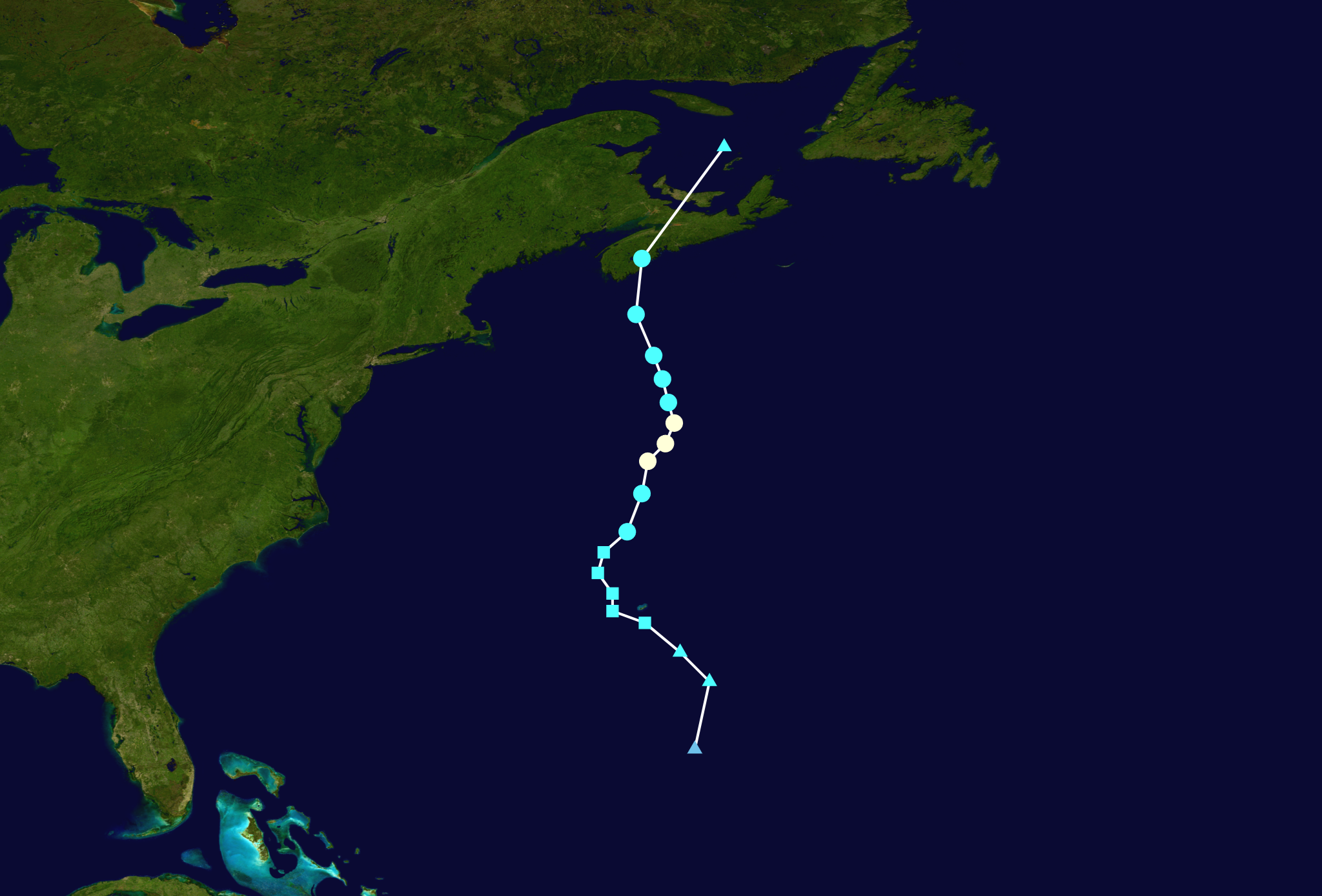
- Duration: October 12 – October 15
- Peak intensity: 80 mph (130 km/h) (1-min); 982 mbar (hPa)

A cold front and an upper-level trough interacted on October 10 to the south of Bermuda, and formed an extratropical storm. The storm passed near the island on October 12, producing hurricane-force winds there. It then organized, becoming a subtropical cyclone on October 12 about 35 mi (55 km) south of Bermuda and a tropical cyclone on October 13. Karen strengthened into a hurricane early the next day, peaking with winds of 80 mph (130 km/h) and a minimum pressure of 982 mbar (29.0 inHg). Shortly thereafter, cooler waters weakened Karen to a tropical storm. Around 12:00 UTC on October 15, the storm struck Nova Scotia near Western Head with winds of 45 mph (70 km/h). Karen accelerated northeastward into the Gulf of St. Lawrence and transitioned into an extratropical cyclone six hours later, which was soon absorbed by a larger extratropical low.

On Bermuda, wind gusts reached as high as 100 mph (160 km/h) at Devonshire Parish. Approximately 23,000 people lost electricity. Damage on the island totaled about $1.4 million, which included impacts to 175 structures and 87 boats. Some roads were inundated due to the storm almost 3 in (76 mm) of rain. Karen produced light to moderate winds across Atlantic Canada, peaking at 47 mph (76 km/h) with a gust of 64 mph (103 km/h) in Cape George in Antigonish County, Nova Scotia, along with a 26 mph (42 km/h) report in Charlottetown, Prince Edward Island. Impact in Atlantic Canada was mostly limited to minor damage to trees.

=== Tropical Storm Lorenzo ===
- Tropical storm (SSHWS)
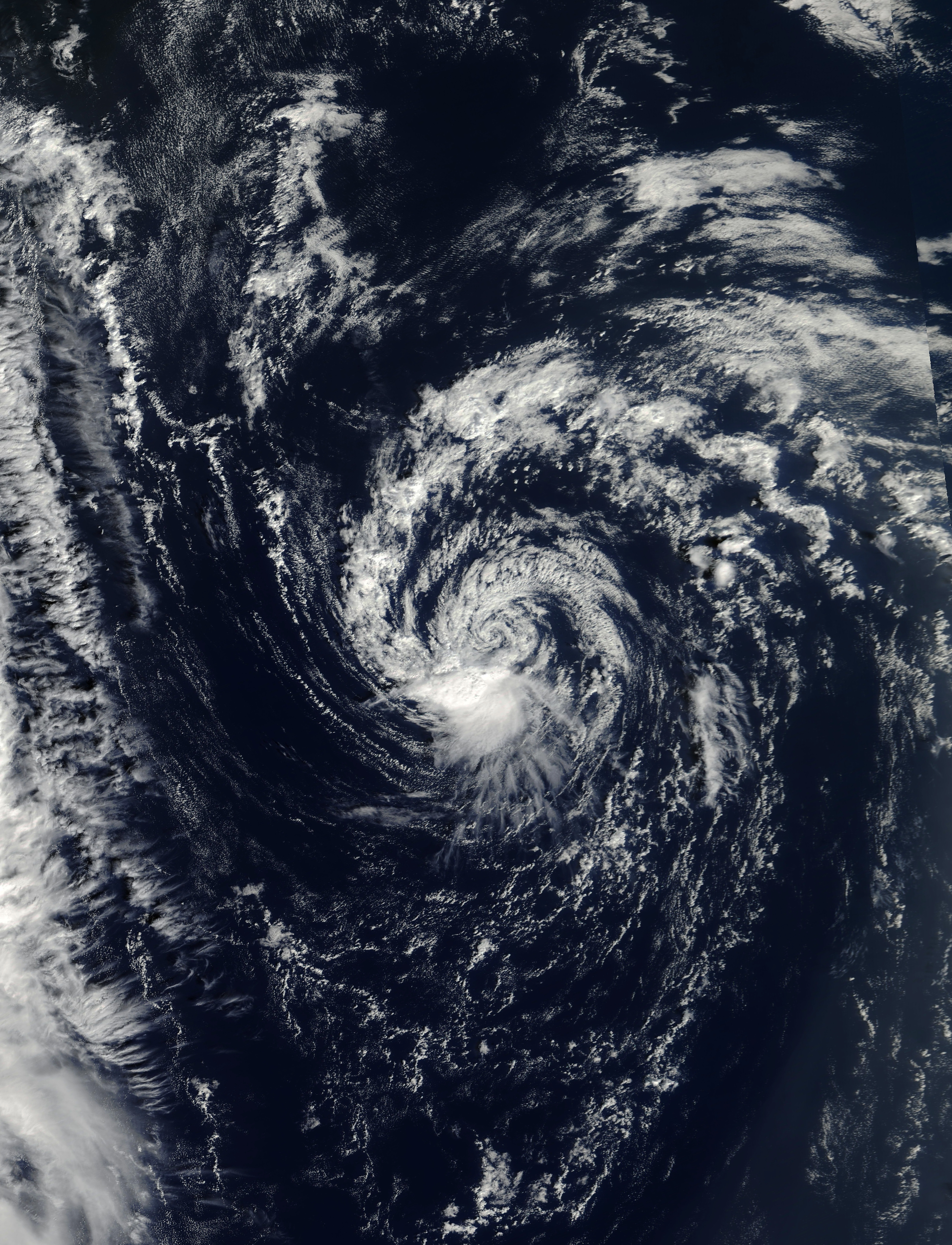
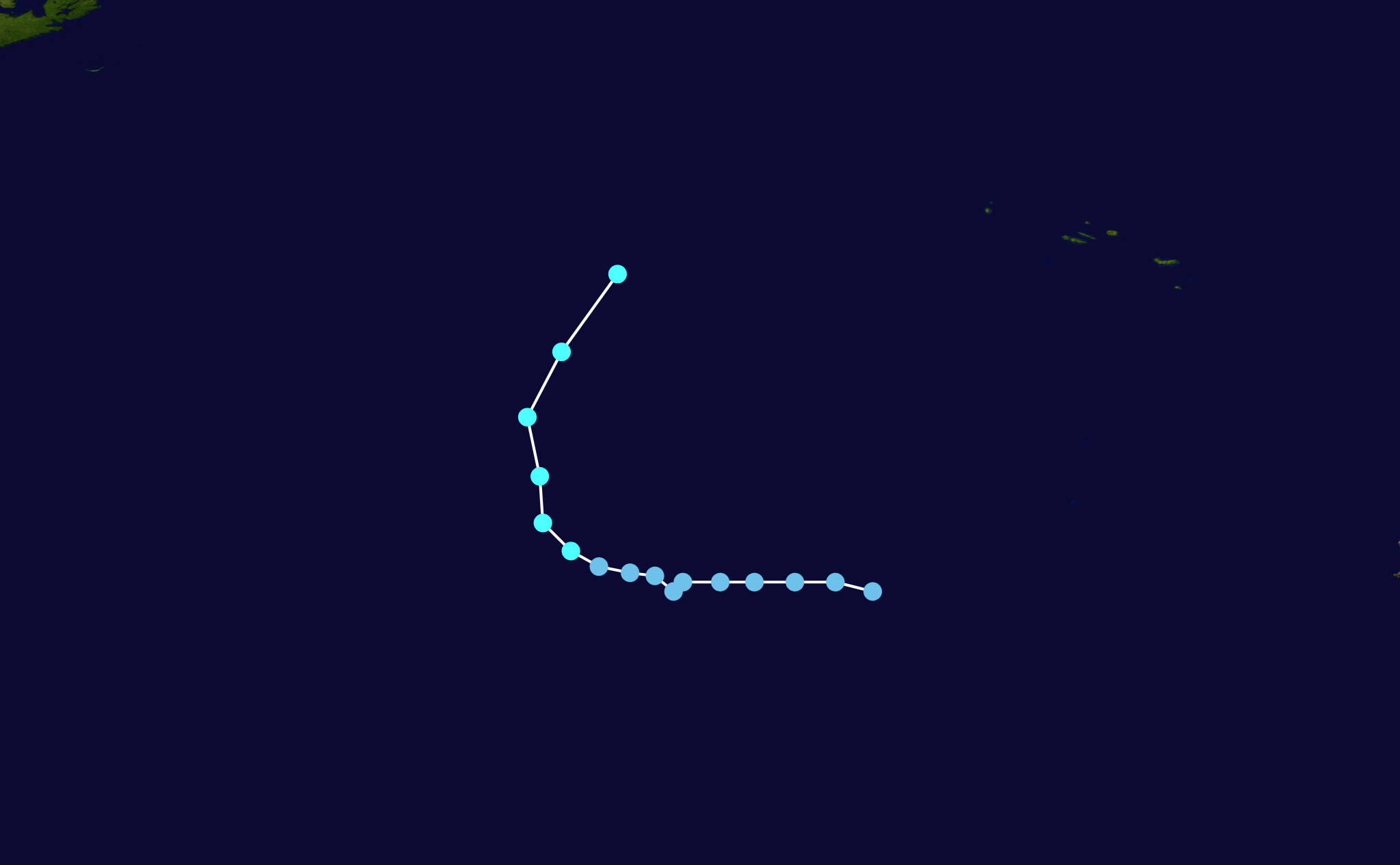
- Duration: October 27 – October 31
- Peak intensity: 40 mph (65 km/h) (1-min); 1007 mbar (hPa)

An upper-level tropospheric trough persisted in the eastern Atlantic, developing a circulation by October 26 which quickly organized. On October 27, it developed into Tropical Depression Fourteen about 865 mi (1,390 km) south-southwest of the western Azores. Moving westward, the depression was forecast to attain winds of at least 60 mph (95 km/h), although it failed to reach that intensity. Banding features developed over the storm, and on October 30, it was upgraded to Tropical Storm Lorenzo. At that time, the cyclone peaked with winds of 40 mph (65 km/h) and a minimum pressure of 1,007 mbar (29.7 inHg). By early on October 31, convection had begun to separate from the circulation, and later in the day Lorenzo became extratropical. The remnants of Lorenzo merged with a frontal system about 690 mi (1,110 km) west of the Azores.

=== Hurricane Michelle ===
- Category 4 hurricane (SSHWS)
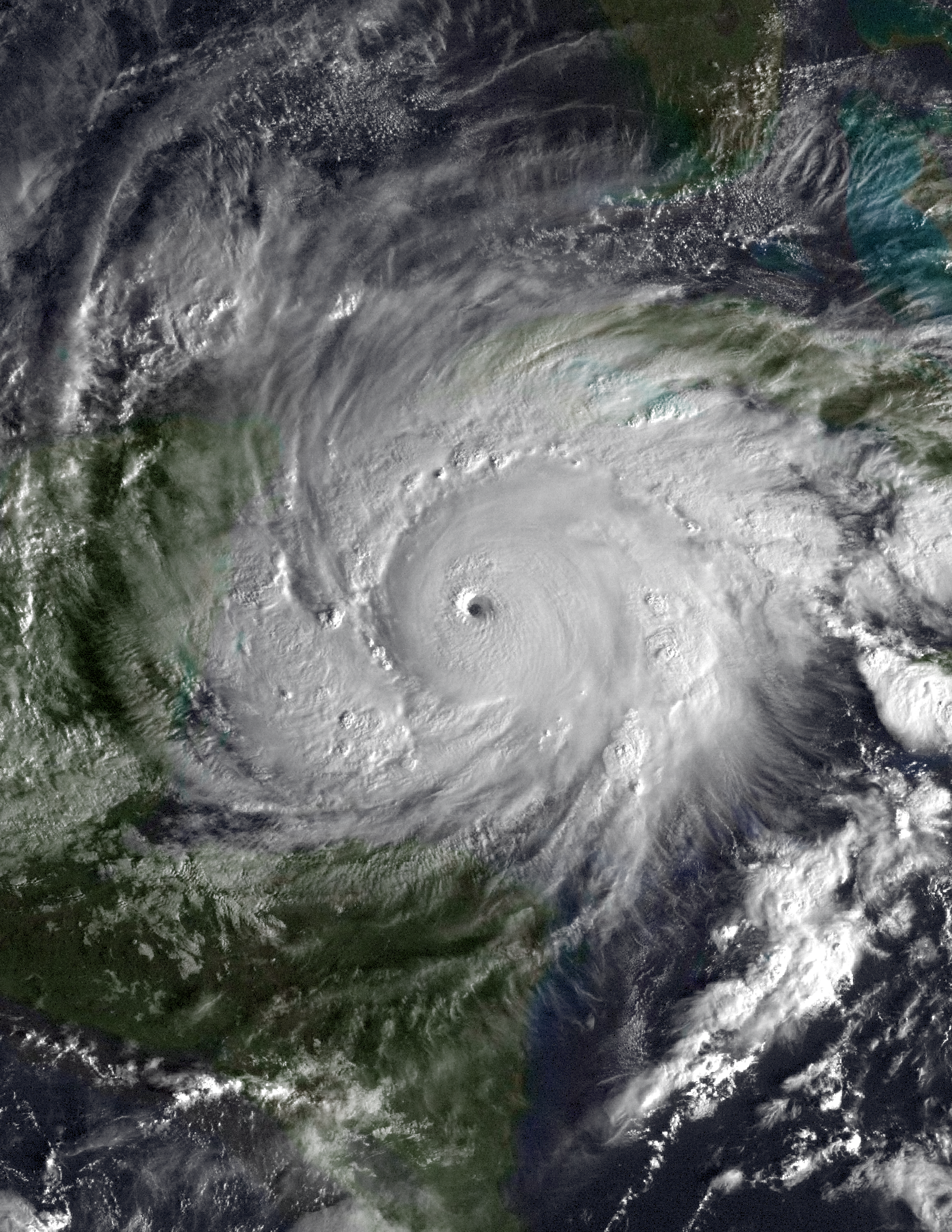
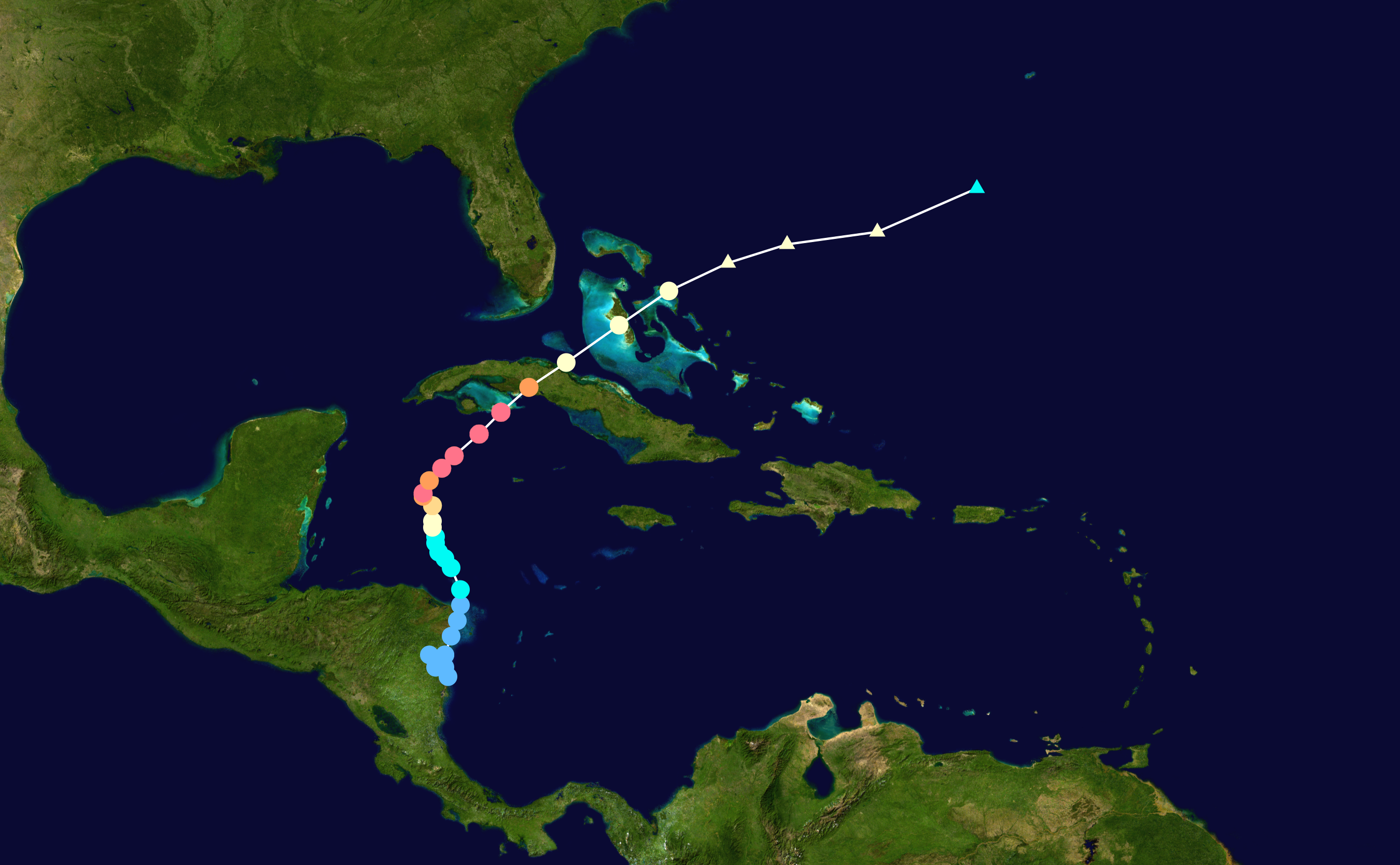
- Duration: October 29 – November 5
- Peak intensity: 140 mph (220 km/h) (1-min); 933 mbar (hPa)

A tropical wave moved across the Atlantic and Caribbean for nearly two weeks before developing into a tropical depression along the east coast of Nicaragua on October 29. Convection increased after the depression entered the Caribbean, and the system intensified into Tropical Storm Michelle on November 1. It strengthened further, becoming a hurricane on November 2 and reaching Category 4 status on November 4, becoming one of only four tropical cyclones on record to reach that intensity in the month of November. The storm's minimum pressure also fell to 933 mbar (27.6 inHg) late on November 3. Michelle made landfall in Cuba twice on the following day, first on Cayo Largo del Sur with peak winds of 140 mph (220 km/h) and then on the mainland near the Bay of Pigs at a slightly weaker intensity. Michelle was the strongest tropical cyclone to strike Cuba since Hurricane Fox in 1952. The storm rapidly weakened and fell to Category 1 intensity as it emerged into the Atlantic early on November 5. Michelle then moved quickly northeastward through the Bahamas and struck Andros and Eleuthera before transitioning into an extratropical cyclone about 125 mi (200 km) northeast of the latter. A frontal system absorbed the remnants of Michelle to the south of Bermuda by early on November 7.

The system that eventually became Michelle dropped torrential rains in several countries, causing at least six deaths in Honduras and four deaths in Nicaragua. An additional 26 people were reported missing in Central America. Torrential precipitation was also reported in Jamaica, with 41.7 in (1,058 mm) of rainfall observed at one location. Flooding and mudslides damaged about 500 homes beyond repairs, while 561 others were impacted to some degree. The storm caused five deaths and $18 million in damage in Jamaica. Michelle went on to affect Cuba, where the storm produced 4 to 5 ft (1.2 to 1.5 m) waves. Rainfall amounts up to 29.69 in (754 mm) were recorded across the island. Sustained winds peaked at 124 mph (200 km/h) at Cayo Largo del Sur, while wind gusts reached at 130 mph (210 km/h) at the same location and in Jagüey Grande. The hurricane demolished 12,579 homes and damaged 166,515 others. Overall, Michelle caused five deaths and about $2 billion in damage in Cuba. Major damage also occurred in the Bahamas, totaling about $300 million.

=== Hurricane Noel ===
- Category 1 hurricane (SSHWS)
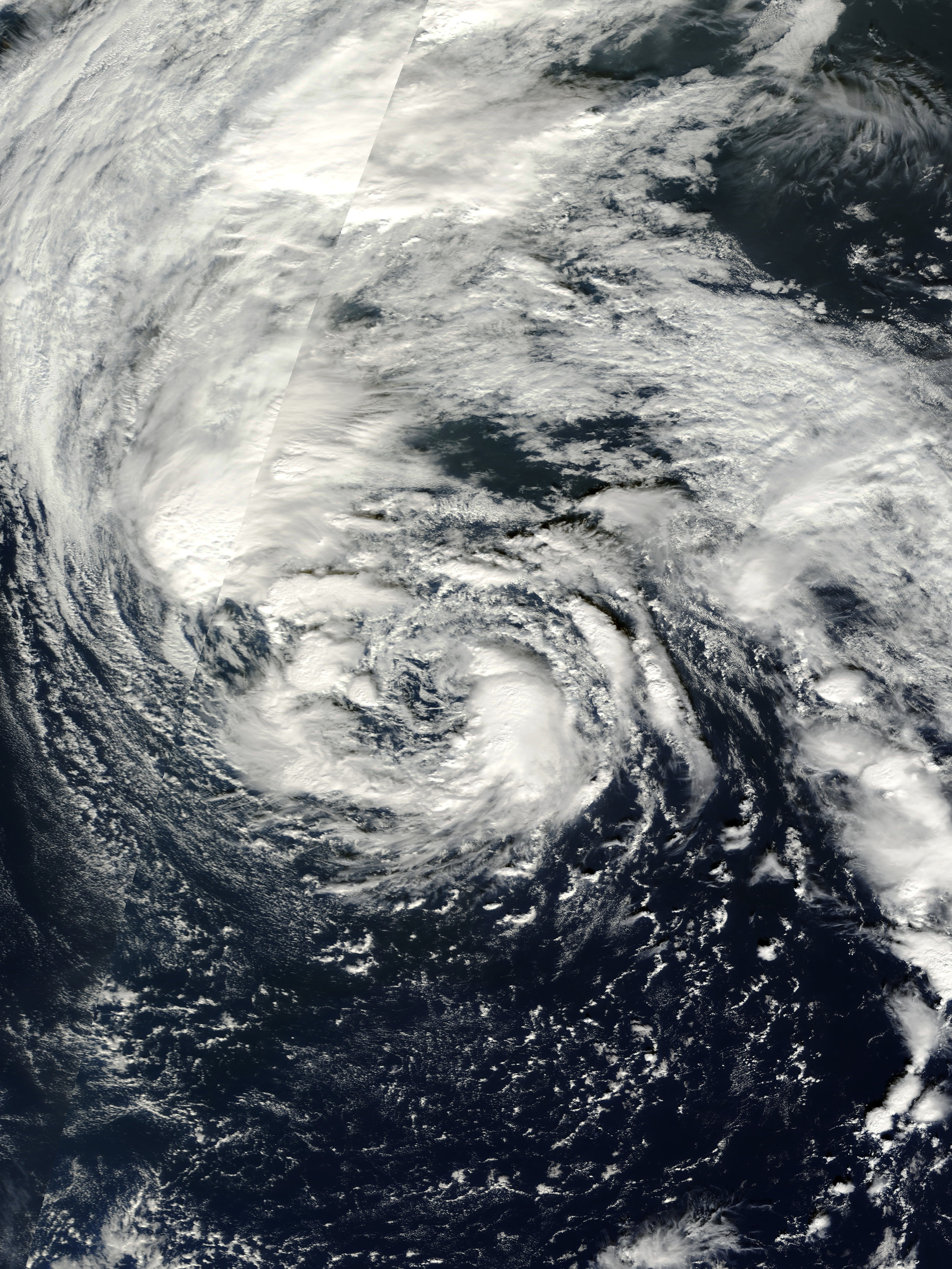
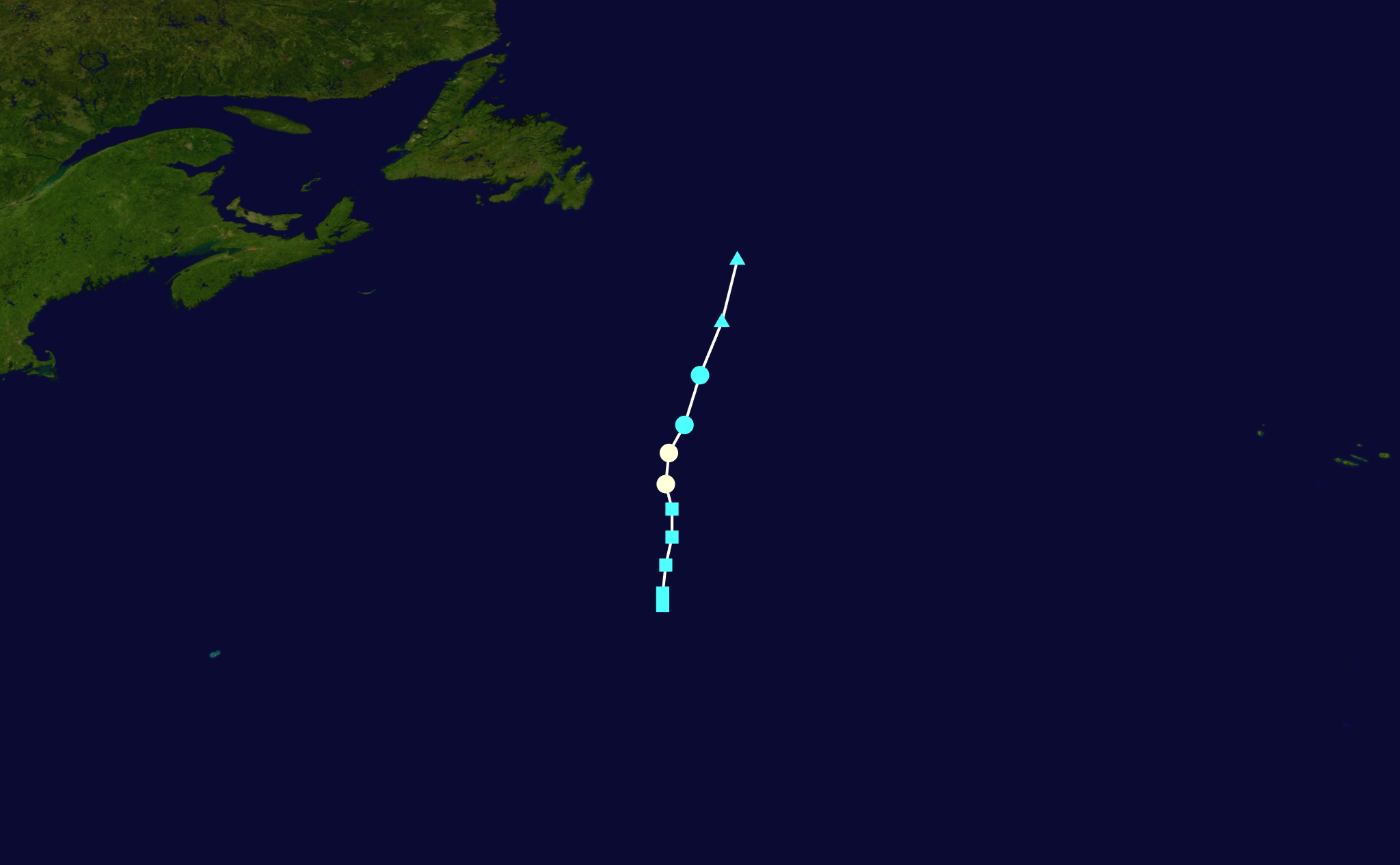
- Duration: November 4 – November 6
- Peak intensity: 75 mph (120 km/h) (1-min); 986 mbar (hPa)

A non-tropical frontal low developed from a cold front on November 1 to the west of the Azores. It intensified while moving west-northwestward and gradually dissipated its frontal structure. It became a subtropical storm on November 4 about 890 mi (1,430 km) south of Cape Race, Newfoundland. Operationally, the storm was considered a non-tropical low, and the National Hurricane Center did not begin issuing advisories until it became a tropical cyclone. It moved slowly northward as convection organized into a ring around the center. As a result of a ship reporting hurricane-force winds near the center, and due to the development of a weak mid-level warm core, the subtropical cyclone was reclassified as Hurricane Noel on November 5. Noel peaked with winds 75 mph (120 km/h) and a minimum pressure of 986 mbar (29.1 inHg). Increasing westerly wind shear limited convection near the center, and Noel weakened to a tropical storm early on November 6. Progressively cooler water temperatures contributed to weakening, and Noel became extratropical later on November 6 about 330 mi (530 km) southeast of Newfoundland. The extratropical remnant continued to the northeast and was absorbed by a larger extratropical storm later that day.

=== Hurricane Olga ===
- Category 1 hurricane (SSHWS)
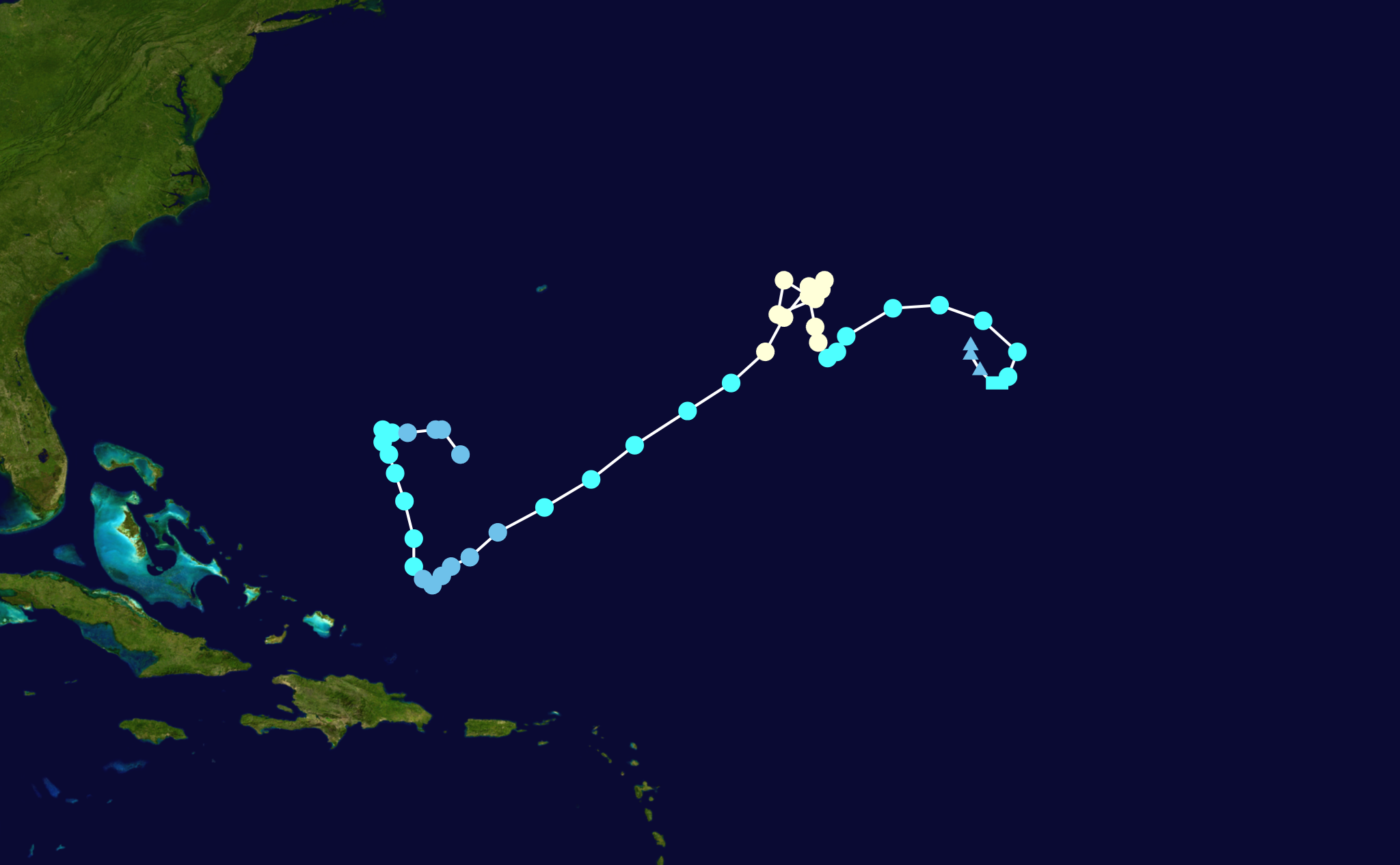
- Duration: November 24 – December 4
- Peak intensity: 90 mph (150 km/h) (1-min); 973 mbar (hPa)

In mid-November, a cold front and a small area of disturbed weather interacted over the western Atlantic, generating an extratropical low on November 22 to the east of Bermuda. Two days later, the low developed into a Subtropical Storm Olga approximately 900 mi (1,450 km) east-southeast of the island. After becoming tropical on November 24, Olga moved generally westward, and eventually strengthened into a hurricane on November 26. Olga peaked with winds of 90 mph (140 km/h) and a minimum pressure of 973 mbar (28.7 inHg) before turning southwestward and weakening back to tropical storm status. On November 30, it deteriorated further to a tropical depression but re-intensified into a tropical storm two days later while trekking northward. Olga weakened to a tropical depression again on December 4 and moved eastward until dissipating about 690 mi (1,110 km) east of Nassau, Bahamas.

At least one ship suffered damage. Rough seas occurred from the Lesser Antilles to the East Coast of the United States. The cyclone's remnants produced heavy rainfall across the Bahamas and Florida.

== Storm names ==
The following list of names was used for named storms that formed in the north Atlantic in 2001. This is the same list used for the 1995 season, except for Lorenzo, Michelle, Olga, and Rebekah, which replaced Luis, Marilyn, Opal, and Roxanne, respectively. Each new name, except for Rebekah, was used for the first (and only in the case of Michelle) time in 2001.

- Allison
- Barry
- Chantal
- Dean
- Erin
- Felix
- Gabrielle
- Humberto
- Iris
- Jerry
- Karen
- Lorenzo
- Michelle
- Noel
- Olga
- Pablo (unused)
- Rebekah (unused)
- Sebastien (unused)
- Tanya (unused)
- Van (unused)
- Wendy (unused)

=== Retirement ===
The World Meteorological Organization retired the names Allison, Iris, and Michelle from the Atlantic hurricane name lists after the 2001 season on account of their destructiveness. They were replaced with Andrea, Ingrid, and Melissa, respectively, for the 2007 season. Allison became the first Atlantic tropical storm to have its name retired.

== Season effects ==
This is a table of all of the storms that formed in the 2001 Atlantic hurricane season. It includes their name, duration, peak classification and intensities, areas affected, damage, and death totals. Deaths in parentheses are additional and indirect (an example of an indirect death would be a traffic accident), but were still related to that storm. Damage and deaths include totals while the storm was extratropical, a wave, or a low, and all of the damage figures are in 2001 USD.

Saffir–Simpson scale
TD	TS	C1	C2	C3	C4	C5

2001 North Atlantic tropical cyclone season statistics
Storm name	Dates active	Storm category at peak intensity	Max 1-min wind mph (km/h)	Min. press. (mbar)	Areas affected	Damage (US$)	Deaths	Ref(s).
Allison	June 5 – 18	Tropical storm	60 (95)	1000	Gulf Coast of the United States, East Coast of the United States, Atlantic Canada	$8.5 billion	41 (9)	
Two	July 11 – 12	Tropical depression	30 (45)	1010	None	None	None	
Barry	August 2 – 7	Tropical storm	70 (110)	990	Cuba, Florida, Alabama	$30 million	2 (7)	
Chantal	August 14 – 22	Tropical storm	70 (110)	997	Windward Islands, Greater Antilles, Yucatan Peninsula, Central America	$4 million	0 (2)	
Dean	August 22 – 28	Tropical storm	70 (110)	994	Lesser Antilles, Greater Antilles, Lucayan Archipelago, Eastern Canada	$7.7 million	None	
Erin	September 1 – 15	Category 3 hurricane	115 (185)	968	Bermuda, Canada, East Coast of the United States	Minimal	None	
Felix	September 7 – 19	Category 3 hurricane	115 (185)	962	None	None	None	
Gabrielle	September 11 – 19	Category 1 hurricane	80 (130)	975	Florida, Newfoundland	> $230 million	2 (1)	
Nine	September 19 – 20	Tropical depression	35 (55)	1005	Central America	Unknown	None	
Humberto	September 21 – 27	Category 2 hurricane	105 (165)	970	Bermuda	None	None	
Iris	October 4 – 9	Category 4 hurricane	145 (230)	948	Windward Islands, Greater Antilles, Central America, Eastern Mexico	$250 million	36	
Jerry	October 6 – 8	Tropical storm	50 (85)	1004	Barbados, Windward Islands, Eastern Caribbean Sea	Minimal	None	
Karen	October 12 – 15	Category 1 hurricane	80 (130)	982	Bermuda, Atlantic Canada	$1.4 million	None	
Lorenzo	October 27 – 31	Tropical storm	40 (65)	1007	None	None	None	
Michelle	October 29 – November 5	Category 4 hurricane	140 (220)	933	Greater Antilles, Central America, Florida, Lucayan Archipelago, Bermuda	$2.43 billion	48	
Noel	November 4 – 6	Category 1 hurricane	75 (120)	986	None	None	None	
Olga	November 24 – December 4	Category 1 hurricane	90 (150)	973	Lucayan Archipelago, Greater Antilles, Florida	None	None	
Season aggregates
17 systems	June 5 – December 4		145 (230)	933		$11.45 billion	131 (17)	

== See also ==
- 2001 Pacific hurricane season
- 2001 Pacific typhoon season
- 2001 North Indian Ocean cyclone season
- South-West Indian Ocean cyclone seasons: 2000–01, 2001–02
- Australian region cyclone seasons: 2000–01, 2001–02
- South Pacific cyclone seasons: 2000–01, 2001–02
- South Atlantic tropical cyclone
- Mediterranean tropical-like cyclone
